

464001–464100 

|-bgcolor=#fefefe
| 464001 ||  || — || November 4, 2004 || Haleakala || Spacewatch || — || align=right data-sort-value="0.66" | 660 m || 
|-id=002 bgcolor=#E9E9E9
| 464002 ||  || — || November 19, 2006 || Catalina || CSS || MAR || align=right | 1.4 km || 
|-id=003 bgcolor=#fefefe
| 464003 ||  || — || March 21, 2009 || Kitt Peak || Spacewatch || — || align=right | 1.1 km || 
|-id=004 bgcolor=#E9E9E9
| 464004 ||  || — || March 26, 2003 || Anderson Mesa || LONEOS || — || align=right | 1.9 km || 
|-id=005 bgcolor=#d6d6d6
| 464005 ||  || — || October 1, 2003 || Kitt Peak || Spacewatch || — || align=right | 2.4 km || 
|-id=006 bgcolor=#E9E9E9
| 464006 ||  || — || August 27, 1995 || Kitt Peak || Spacewatch || — || align=right | 2.2 km || 
|-id=007 bgcolor=#d6d6d6
| 464007 ||  || — || November 16, 2009 || Kitt Peak || Spacewatch || KOR || align=right | 1.1 km || 
|-id=008 bgcolor=#d6d6d6
| 464008 ||  || — || January 28, 2011 || Mount Lemmon || Mount Lemmon Survey || KOR || align=right | 1.1 km || 
|-id=009 bgcolor=#d6d6d6
| 464009 ||  || — || December 17, 2009 || Kitt Peak || Spacewatch || — || align=right | 2.0 km || 
|-id=010 bgcolor=#E9E9E9
| 464010 ||  || — || November 25, 2005 || Kitt Peak || Spacewatch || — || align=right | 2.1 km || 
|-id=011 bgcolor=#fefefe
| 464011 ||  || — || January 11, 2008 || Kitt Peak || Spacewatch || — || align=right data-sort-value="0.80" | 800 m || 
|-id=012 bgcolor=#E9E9E9
| 464012 ||  || — || November 12, 2010 || Mount Lemmon || Mount Lemmon Survey || — || align=right data-sort-value="0.99" | 990 m || 
|-id=013 bgcolor=#fefefe
| 464013 ||  || — || June 15, 2010 || WISE || WISE || — || align=right | 1.7 km || 
|-id=014 bgcolor=#fefefe
| 464014 ||  || — || October 21, 1995 || Kitt Peak || Spacewatch || SUL || align=right | 1.9 km || 
|-id=015 bgcolor=#E9E9E9
| 464015 ||  || — || December 14, 2010 || Mount Lemmon || Mount Lemmon Survey || — || align=right | 2.3 km || 
|-id=016 bgcolor=#fefefe
| 464016 ||  || — || September 28, 2003 || Anderson Mesa || LONEOS || V || align=right data-sort-value="0.69" | 690 m || 
|-id=017 bgcolor=#fefefe
| 464017 ||  || — || December 4, 2008 || Mount Lemmon || Mount Lemmon Survey || — || align=right data-sort-value="0.94" | 940 m || 
|-id=018 bgcolor=#E9E9E9
| 464018 ||  || — || October 9, 2005 || Kitt Peak || Spacewatch || — || align=right | 1.3 km || 
|-id=019 bgcolor=#E9E9E9
| 464019 ||  || — || August 25, 2004 || Kitt Peak || Spacewatch || — || align=right | 2.5 km || 
|-id=020 bgcolor=#d6d6d6
| 464020 ||  || — || March 4, 2005 || Kitt Peak || Spacewatch || — || align=right | 2.1 km || 
|-id=021 bgcolor=#E9E9E9
| 464021 ||  || — || January 29, 2011 || Mount Lemmon || Mount Lemmon Survey || — || align=right | 2.0 km || 
|-id=022 bgcolor=#d6d6d6
| 464022 ||  || — || November 8, 2009 || Catalina || CSS || — || align=right | 2.3 km || 
|-id=023 bgcolor=#E9E9E9
| 464023 ||  || — || October 22, 2005 || Kitt Peak || Spacewatch || — || align=right | 1.7 km || 
|-id=024 bgcolor=#d6d6d6
| 464024 ||  || — || April 5, 2005 || Palomar || NEAT || — || align=right | 3.0 km || 
|-id=025 bgcolor=#E9E9E9
| 464025 ||  || — || September 28, 2000 || Kitt Peak || Spacewatch || — || align=right | 1.7 km || 
|-id=026 bgcolor=#E9E9E9
| 464026 ||  || — || September 25, 2009 || Kitt Peak || Spacewatch || HOF || align=right | 2.3 km || 
|-id=027 bgcolor=#d6d6d6
| 464027 ||  || — || December 29, 2008 || Kitt Peak || Spacewatch || 3:2 || align=right | 4.2 km || 
|-id=028 bgcolor=#d6d6d6
| 464028 ||  || — || September 24, 2008 || Mount Lemmon || Mount Lemmon Survey || — || align=right | 2.3 km || 
|-id=029 bgcolor=#d6d6d6
| 464029 ||  || — || November 30, 2003 || Kitt Peak || Spacewatch || — || align=right | 2.2 km || 
|-id=030 bgcolor=#d6d6d6
| 464030 ||  || — || April 29, 2006 || Kitt Peak || Spacewatch || — || align=right | 3.1 km || 
|-id=031 bgcolor=#fefefe
| 464031 ||  || — || February 20, 2006 || Kitt Peak || Spacewatch || — || align=right data-sort-value="0.56" | 560 m || 
|-id=032 bgcolor=#d6d6d6
| 464032 ||  || — || October 20, 2003 || Kitt Peak || Spacewatch || — || align=right | 2.0 km || 
|-id=033 bgcolor=#d6d6d6
| 464033 ||  || — || February 2, 2005 || Kitt Peak || Spacewatch || — || align=right | 2.0 km || 
|-id=034 bgcolor=#fefefe
| 464034 ||  || — || November 17, 2004 || Campo Imperatore || CINEOS || — || align=right data-sort-value="0.69" | 690 m || 
|-id=035 bgcolor=#E9E9E9
| 464035 ||  || — || August 27, 2009 || Kitt Peak || Spacewatch || — || align=right | 1.9 km || 
|-id=036 bgcolor=#E9E9E9
| 464036 ||  || — || December 21, 2006 || Kitt Peak || Spacewatch || — || align=right | 1.2 km || 
|-id=037 bgcolor=#fefefe
| 464037 ||  || — || May 21, 2006 || Kitt Peak || Spacewatch || — || align=right data-sort-value="0.73" | 730 m || 
|-id=038 bgcolor=#E9E9E9
| 464038 ||  || — || March 20, 1999 || Apache Point || SDSS || — || align=right | 1.6 km || 
|-id=039 bgcolor=#E9E9E9
| 464039 ||  || — || December 13, 2010 || Kitt Peak || Spacewatch || — || align=right | 1.8 km || 
|-id=040 bgcolor=#E9E9E9
| 464040 ||  || — || November 11, 2010 || Mount Lemmon || Mount Lemmon Survey || AEO || align=right | 1.1 km || 
|-id=041 bgcolor=#E9E9E9
| 464041 ||  || — || March 26, 2003 || Kitt Peak || Spacewatch || ADE || align=right | 2.0 km || 
|-id=042 bgcolor=#fefefe
| 464042 ||  || — || September 14, 2006 || Catalina || CSS || — || align=right data-sort-value="0.85" | 850 m || 
|-id=043 bgcolor=#d6d6d6
| 464043 ||  || — || September 29, 2003 || Anderson Mesa || LONEOS || — || align=right | 2.4 km || 
|-id=044 bgcolor=#d6d6d6
| 464044 ||  || — || October 10, 2008 || Mount Lemmon || Mount Lemmon Survey || EOS || align=right | 1.9 km || 
|-id=045 bgcolor=#d6d6d6
| 464045 ||  || — || April 27, 2011 || Kitt Peak || Spacewatch || — || align=right | 2.7 km || 
|-id=046 bgcolor=#d6d6d6
| 464046 ||  || — || February 28, 2009 || Kitt Peak || Spacewatch || 3:2 || align=right | 7.4 km || 
|-id=047 bgcolor=#E9E9E9
| 464047 ||  || — || February 26, 2012 || Mount Lemmon || Mount Lemmon Survey || — || align=right | 1.1 km || 
|-id=048 bgcolor=#E9E9E9
| 464048 ||  || — || October 8, 2004 || Kitt Peak || Spacewatch || — || align=right | 2.1 km || 
|-id=049 bgcolor=#d6d6d6
| 464049 ||  || — || April 29, 2011 || Mount Lemmon || Mount Lemmon Survey || — || align=right | 2.5 km || 
|-id=050 bgcolor=#d6d6d6
| 464050 ||  || — || December 31, 2008 || Mount Lemmon || Mount Lemmon Survey || 7:4 || align=right | 3.6 km || 
|-id=051 bgcolor=#d6d6d6
| 464051 ||  || — || December 11, 2009 || Mount Lemmon || Mount Lemmon Survey || — || align=right | 2.4 km || 
|-id=052 bgcolor=#fefefe
| 464052 ||  || — || December 6, 2005 || Kitt Peak || Spacewatch || — || align=right data-sort-value="0.73" | 730 m || 
|-id=053 bgcolor=#E9E9E9
| 464053 ||  || — || April 1, 2008 || Kitt Peak || Spacewatch || — || align=right data-sort-value="0.99" | 990 m || 
|-id=054 bgcolor=#d6d6d6
| 464054 ||  || — || January 25, 2006 || Kitt Peak || Spacewatch || KOR || align=right | 1.1 km || 
|-id=055 bgcolor=#E9E9E9
| 464055 ||  || — || March 8, 2008 || Kitt Peak || Spacewatch || — || align=right | 1.2 km || 
|-id=056 bgcolor=#d6d6d6
| 464056 ||  || — || June 10, 2012 || Mount Lemmon || Mount Lemmon Survey || EOS || align=right | 1.6 km || 
|-id=057 bgcolor=#d6d6d6
| 464057 ||  || — || March 20, 2010 || WISE || WISE || — || align=right | 3.5 km || 
|-id=058 bgcolor=#fefefe
| 464058 ||  || — || November 10, 2010 || Kitt Peak || Spacewatch || — || align=right data-sort-value="0.98" | 980 m || 
|-id=059 bgcolor=#d6d6d6
| 464059 ||  || — || September 21, 2003 || Kitt Peak || Spacewatch || — || align=right | 2.5 km || 
|-id=060 bgcolor=#d6d6d6
| 464060 ||  || — || March 18, 2010 || WISE || WISE || — || align=right | 2.8 km || 
|-id=061 bgcolor=#d6d6d6
| 464061 ||  || — || October 23, 2009 || Kitt Peak || Spacewatch || — || align=right | 2.8 km || 
|-id=062 bgcolor=#E9E9E9
| 464062 ||  || — || September 23, 2009 || Mount Lemmon || Mount Lemmon Survey || AGN || align=right | 1.1 km || 
|-id=063 bgcolor=#E9E9E9
| 464063 ||  || — || January 17, 2007 || Kitt Peak || Spacewatch || — || align=right | 1.6 km || 
|-id=064 bgcolor=#d6d6d6
| 464064 ||  || — || September 17, 2004 || Kitt Peak || Spacewatch || — || align=right | 2.0 km || 
|-id=065 bgcolor=#fefefe
| 464065 ||  || — || February 2, 2008 || Kitt Peak || Spacewatch || — || align=right data-sort-value="0.79" | 790 m || 
|-id=066 bgcolor=#d6d6d6
| 464066 ||  || — || April 6, 2011 || Mount Lemmon || Mount Lemmon Survey || — || align=right | 2.8 km || 
|-id=067 bgcolor=#E9E9E9
| 464067 ||  || — || January 24, 2007 || Mount Lemmon || Mount Lemmon Survey || — || align=right | 1.4 km || 
|-id=068 bgcolor=#d6d6d6
| 464068 ||  || — || April 14, 2007 || Kitt Peak || Spacewatch || — || align=right | 2.4 km || 
|-id=069 bgcolor=#d6d6d6
| 464069 ||  || — || September 6, 2008 || Mount Lemmon || Mount Lemmon Survey || — || align=right | 2.4 km || 
|-id=070 bgcolor=#d6d6d6
| 464070 ||  || — || April 28, 2010 || WISE || WISE || — || align=right | 3.9 km || 
|-id=071 bgcolor=#E9E9E9
| 464071 ||  || — || December 6, 2010 || Mount Lemmon || Mount Lemmon Survey || — || align=right | 1.3 km || 
|-id=072 bgcolor=#E9E9E9
| 464072 ||  || — || December 1, 2005 || Kitt Peak || Spacewatch || MRX || align=right | 1.0 km || 
|-id=073 bgcolor=#E9E9E9
| 464073 ||  || — || April 3, 2008 || Mount Lemmon || Mount Lemmon Survey || — || align=right data-sort-value="0.96" | 960 m || 
|-id=074 bgcolor=#E9E9E9
| 464074 ||  || — || March 6, 2008 || Catalina || CSS || EUN || align=right | 1.6 km || 
|-id=075 bgcolor=#d6d6d6
| 464075 ||  || — || November 10, 2009 || Mount Lemmon || Mount Lemmon Survey || INA || align=right | 2.6 km || 
|-id=076 bgcolor=#E9E9E9
| 464076 ||  || — || August 28, 2005 || Kitt Peak || Spacewatch || — || align=right | 1.3 km || 
|-id=077 bgcolor=#E9E9E9
| 464077 ||  || — || January 10, 2003 || Socorro || LINEAR || — || align=right | 2.2 km || 
|-id=078 bgcolor=#d6d6d6
| 464078 ||  || — || March 9, 2011 || Mount Lemmon || Mount Lemmon Survey || EOS || align=right | 1.9 km || 
|-id=079 bgcolor=#d6d6d6
| 464079 ||  || — || April 29, 2011 || Mount Lemmon || Mount Lemmon Survey || — || align=right | 2.5 km || 
|-id=080 bgcolor=#d6d6d6
| 464080 ||  || — || March 2, 2006 || Kitt Peak || Spacewatch || — || align=right | 4.3 km || 
|-id=081 bgcolor=#E9E9E9
| 464081 ||  || — || December 9, 2002 || Bergisch Gladbac || W. Bickel || EUN || align=right | 1.4 km || 
|-id=082 bgcolor=#E9E9E9
| 464082 ||  || — || December 14, 2010 || Mount Lemmon || Mount Lemmon Survey || — || align=right | 2.1 km || 
|-id=083 bgcolor=#E9E9E9
| 464083 ||  || — || June 8, 2013 || Mount Lemmon || Mount Lemmon Survey || — || align=right | 1.7 km || 
|-id=084 bgcolor=#fefefe
| 464084 ||  || — || December 3, 2007 || Kitt Peak || Spacewatch || V || align=right data-sort-value="0.78" | 780 m || 
|-id=085 bgcolor=#E9E9E9
| 464085 ||  || — || November 2, 2010 || Mount Lemmon || Mount Lemmon Survey || — || align=right data-sort-value="0.96" | 960 m || 
|-id=086 bgcolor=#E9E9E9
| 464086 ||  || — || January 28, 2011 || Catalina || CSS || — || align=right | 2.4 km || 
|-id=087 bgcolor=#d6d6d6
| 464087 ||  || — || March 28, 2011 || Mount Lemmon || Mount Lemmon Survey || — || align=right | 2.2 km || 
|-id=088 bgcolor=#E9E9E9
| 464088 ||  || — || May 1, 2012 || Mount Lemmon || Mount Lemmon Survey || — || align=right data-sort-value="0.98" | 980 m || 
|-id=089 bgcolor=#E9E9E9
| 464089 ||  || — || February 28, 2008 || Mount Lemmon || Mount Lemmon Survey || — || align=right data-sort-value="0.83" | 830 m || 
|-id=090 bgcolor=#fefefe
| 464090 ||  || — || September 12, 2007 || Mount Lemmon || Mount Lemmon Survey || — || align=right data-sort-value="0.67" | 670 m || 
|-id=091 bgcolor=#fefefe
| 464091 ||  || — || August 13, 2010 || Kitt Peak || Spacewatch || V || align=right data-sort-value="0.59" | 590 m || 
|-id=092 bgcolor=#d6d6d6
| 464092 ||  || — || August 7, 2008 || Kitt Peak || Spacewatch || — || align=right | 2.4 km || 
|-id=093 bgcolor=#E9E9E9
| 464093 ||  || — || November 30, 2005 || Anderson Mesa || LONEOS || — || align=right | 2.2 km || 
|-id=094 bgcolor=#fefefe
| 464094 ||  || — || January 30, 2012 || Mount Lemmon || Mount Lemmon Survey || — || align=right data-sort-value="0.71" | 710 m || 
|-id=095 bgcolor=#E9E9E9
| 464095 ||  || — || February 7, 2002 || Palomar || NEAT || — || align=right | 2.3 km || 
|-id=096 bgcolor=#E9E9E9
| 464096 ||  || — || March 27, 2012 || Mount Lemmon || Mount Lemmon Survey || — || align=right | 1.6 km || 
|-id=097 bgcolor=#d6d6d6
| 464097 ||  || — || January 23, 2011 || Mount Lemmon || Mount Lemmon Survey || BRA || align=right | 1.4 km || 
|-id=098 bgcolor=#fefefe
| 464098 ||  || — || July 16, 2010 || WISE || WISE || — || align=right | 2.0 km || 
|-id=099 bgcolor=#E9E9E9
| 464099 ||  || — || January 17, 2007 || Kitt Peak || Spacewatch || — || align=right | 1.4 km || 
|-id=100 bgcolor=#d6d6d6
| 464100 ||  || — || February 11, 2000 || Kitt Peak || Spacewatch || — || align=right | 2.0 km || 
|}

464101–464200 

|-bgcolor=#d6d6d6
| 464101 ||  || — || November 17, 2009 || Mount Lemmon || Mount Lemmon Survey || — || align=right | 3.2 km || 
|-id=102 bgcolor=#E9E9E9
| 464102 ||  || — || February 21, 2003 || Palomar || NEAT || (5) || align=right | 1.1 km || 
|-id=103 bgcolor=#d6d6d6
| 464103 ||  || — || September 28, 2003 || Anderson Mesa || LONEOS || — || align=right | 2.5 km || 
|-id=104 bgcolor=#d6d6d6
| 464104 ||  || — || October 21, 2008 || Kitt Peak || Spacewatch || — || align=right | 3.3 km || 
|-id=105 bgcolor=#d6d6d6
| 464105 ||  || — || November 9, 2009 || Catalina || CSS || — || align=right | 2.6 km || 
|-id=106 bgcolor=#d6d6d6
| 464106 ||  || — || September 28, 2013 || Kitt Peak || Spacewatch || — || align=right | 2.7 km || 
|-id=107 bgcolor=#d6d6d6
| 464107 ||  || — || December 20, 2009 || Mount Lemmon || Mount Lemmon Survey || — || align=right | 3.4 km || 
|-id=108 bgcolor=#E9E9E9
| 464108 ||  || — || March 16, 2002 || Kitt Peak || Spacewatch || — || align=right | 2.1 km || 
|-id=109 bgcolor=#E9E9E9
| 464109 ||  || — || December 24, 2005 || Catalina || CSS || — || align=right | 2.2 km || 
|-id=110 bgcolor=#E9E9E9
| 464110 ||  || — || February 7, 2011 || Mount Lemmon || Mount Lemmon Survey || HOF || align=right | 2.1 km || 
|-id=111 bgcolor=#E9E9E9
| 464111 ||  || — || October 25, 2005 || Kitt Peak || Spacewatch || WIT || align=right data-sort-value="0.96" | 960 m || 
|-id=112 bgcolor=#E9E9E9
| 464112 ||  || — || November 1, 2010 || Mount Lemmon || Mount Lemmon Survey || — || align=right | 2.0 km || 
|-id=113 bgcolor=#d6d6d6
| 464113 ||  || — || October 26, 2009 || Mount Lemmon || Mount Lemmon Survey || — || align=right | 2.9 km || 
|-id=114 bgcolor=#E9E9E9
| 464114 ||  || — || December 6, 2005 || Kitt Peak || Spacewatch || — || align=right | 1.9 km || 
|-id=115 bgcolor=#fefefe
| 464115 ||  || — || October 31, 2007 || Mount Lemmon || Mount Lemmon Survey || — || align=right data-sort-value="0.83" | 830 m || 
|-id=116 bgcolor=#E9E9E9
| 464116 ||  || — || August 30, 2005 || Kitt Peak || Spacewatch || — || align=right | 1.3 km || 
|-id=117 bgcolor=#fefefe
| 464117 ||  || — || December 1, 2003 || Kitt Peak || Spacewatch || — || align=right data-sort-value="0.93" | 930 m || 
|-id=118 bgcolor=#d6d6d6
| 464118 ||  || — || February 6, 2007 || Kitt Peak || Spacewatch || 3:2 || align=right | 4.2 km || 
|-id=119 bgcolor=#d6d6d6
| 464119 ||  || — || October 16, 2007 || Catalina || CSS || — || align=right | 4.2 km || 
|-id=120 bgcolor=#d6d6d6
| 464120 ||  || — || October 9, 2008 || Mount Lemmon || Mount Lemmon Survey || EOS || align=right | 2.1 km || 
|-id=121 bgcolor=#d6d6d6
| 464121 ||  || — || October 9, 2008 || Mount Lemmon || Mount Lemmon Survey || — || align=right | 2.8 km || 
|-id=122 bgcolor=#d6d6d6
| 464122 ||  || — || November 26, 2009 || Kitt Peak || Spacewatch || — || align=right | 2.6 km || 
|-id=123 bgcolor=#d6d6d6
| 464123 ||  || — || April 24, 2006 || Kitt Peak || Spacewatch || — || align=right | 2.7 km || 
|-id=124 bgcolor=#d6d6d6
| 464124 ||  || — || April 30, 2005 || Kitt Peak || Spacewatch || — || align=right | 3.6 km || 
|-id=125 bgcolor=#E9E9E9
| 464125 ||  || — || October 1, 2005 || Mount Lemmon || Mount Lemmon Survey || — || align=right | 1.6 km || 
|-id=126 bgcolor=#d6d6d6
| 464126 ||  || — || September 5, 2008 || Kitt Peak || Spacewatch || — || align=right | 2.6 km || 
|-id=127 bgcolor=#d6d6d6
| 464127 ||  || — || February 2, 2005 || Kitt Peak || Spacewatch || — || align=right | 3.0 km || 
|-id=128 bgcolor=#d6d6d6
| 464128 ||  || — || September 10, 2007 || Mount Lemmon || Mount Lemmon Survey || — || align=right | 2.8 km || 
|-id=129 bgcolor=#d6d6d6
| 464129 ||  || — || July 28, 2013 || Kitt Peak || Spacewatch || — || align=right | 3.2 km || 
|-id=130 bgcolor=#d6d6d6
| 464130 ||  || — || April 6, 2011 || Mount Lemmon || Mount Lemmon Survey || — || align=right | 2.9 km || 
|-id=131 bgcolor=#E9E9E9
| 464131 ||  || — || November 12, 2001 || Socorro || LINEAR || — || align=right | 2.2 km || 
|-id=132 bgcolor=#fefefe
| 464132 ||  || — || May 8, 2005 || Mount Lemmon || Mount Lemmon Survey || — || align=right | 1.0 km || 
|-id=133 bgcolor=#E9E9E9
| 464133 ||  || — || November 5, 2010 || Mount Lemmon || Mount Lemmon Survey || — || align=right | 1.2 km || 
|-id=134 bgcolor=#E9E9E9
| 464134 ||  || — || May 7, 2008 || Mount Lemmon || Mount Lemmon Survey || — || align=right | 2.4 km || 
|-id=135 bgcolor=#E9E9E9
| 464135 ||  || — || December 12, 2010 || Socorro || LINEAR || EUN || align=right | 1.1 km || 
|-id=136 bgcolor=#d6d6d6
| 464136 ||  || — || September 26, 2003 || Space Surveillance || NEAT || — || align=right | 3.2 km || 
|-id=137 bgcolor=#d6d6d6
| 464137 ||  || — || November 14, 2003 || Palomar || NEAT || — || align=right | 3.3 km || 
|-id=138 bgcolor=#E9E9E9
| 464138 ||  || — || December 31, 2002 || Anderson Mesa || LONEOS || — || align=right | 1.7 km || 
|-id=139 bgcolor=#fefefe
| 464139 ||  || — || February 26, 2012 || Mount Lemmon || Mount Lemmon Survey || — || align=right | 1.0 km || 
|-id=140 bgcolor=#E9E9E9
| 464140 ||  || — || March 30, 2003 || Kitt Peak || Spacewatch || — || align=right | 1.5 km || 
|-id=141 bgcolor=#d6d6d6
| 464141 ||  || — || October 6, 2008 || Mount Lemmon || Mount Lemmon Survey || — || align=right | 2.8 km || 
|-id=142 bgcolor=#E9E9E9
| 464142 ||  || — || October 10, 2005 || Kitt Peak || Spacewatch || — || align=right | 2.0 km || 
|-id=143 bgcolor=#fefefe
| 464143 ||  || — || November 4, 2007 || Kitt Peak || Spacewatch || — || align=right data-sort-value="0.96" | 960 m || 
|-id=144 bgcolor=#E9E9E9
| 464144 ||  || — || January 10, 2007 || Kitt Peak || Spacewatch || — || align=right | 1.3 km || 
|-id=145 bgcolor=#E9E9E9
| 464145 ||  || — || March 4, 2008 || Kitt Peak || Spacewatch || — || align=right | 1.4 km || 
|-id=146 bgcolor=#d6d6d6
| 464146 ||  || — || November 21, 2009 || Mount Lemmon || Mount Lemmon Survey || — || align=right | 2.6 km || 
|-id=147 bgcolor=#E9E9E9
| 464147 ||  || — || November 14, 2001 || Kitt Peak || Spacewatch || — || align=right | 1.4 km || 
|-id=148 bgcolor=#E9E9E9
| 464148 ||  || — || November 17, 1995 || Kitt Peak || Spacewatch || — || align=right | 2.2 km || 
|-id=149 bgcolor=#d6d6d6
| 464149 ||  || — || June 23, 2012 || ESA OGS || Mount Lemmon Survey || EOS || align=right | 2.4 km || 
|-id=150 bgcolor=#d6d6d6
| 464150 ||  || — || January 4, 2010 || Sierra Stars || Sierra Stars Obs. || — || align=right | 4.0 km || 
|-id=151 bgcolor=#E9E9E9
| 464151 ||  || — || October 21, 2006 || Mayhill-ISON || Mount Lemmon Survey || — || align=right | 1.6 km || 
|-id=152 bgcolor=#d6d6d6
| 464152 ||  || — || January 16, 2004 || Kitt Peak || Spacewatch || — || align=right | 3.1 km || 
|-id=153 bgcolor=#d6d6d6
| 464153 ||  || — || September 3, 2013 || Kitt Peak || Spacewatch || — || align=right | 3.0 km || 
|-id=154 bgcolor=#E9E9E9
| 464154 ||  || — || September 24, 2005 || Kitt Peak || Spacewatch || — || align=right | 1.1 km || 
|-id=155 bgcolor=#E9E9E9
| 464155 ||  || — || October 7, 2005 || Kitt Peak || Spacewatch || — || align=right | 1.4 km || 
|-id=156 bgcolor=#E9E9E9
| 464156 ||  || — || October 6, 2004 || Kitt Peak || Spacewatch || HOF || align=right | 2.7 km || 
|-id=157 bgcolor=#d6d6d6
| 464157 ||  || — || November 7, 2008 || Mount Lemmon || Mount Lemmon Survey || — || align=right | 3.3 km || 
|-id=158 bgcolor=#E9E9E9
| 464158 ||  || — || December 10, 2010 || Mount Lemmon || Mount Lemmon Survey || — || align=right | 1.7 km || 
|-id=159 bgcolor=#E9E9E9
| 464159 ||  || — || December 10, 2010 || Mount Lemmon || Mount Lemmon Survey || — || align=right | 2.0 km || 
|-id=160 bgcolor=#d6d6d6
| 464160 ||  || — || November 15, 1995 || Kitt Peak || Spacewatch || 7:4 || align=right | 5.8 km || 
|-id=161 bgcolor=#d6d6d6
| 464161 ||  || — || March 27, 2011 || Mount Lemmon || Mount Lemmon Survey || — || align=right | 3.0 km || 
|-id=162 bgcolor=#d6d6d6
| 464162 ||  || — || June 21, 2007 || Kitt Peak || Spacewatch || — || align=right | 4.2 km || 
|-id=163 bgcolor=#d6d6d6
| 464163 ||  || — || April 28, 2010 || WISE || WISE || — || align=right | 3.2 km || 
|-id=164 bgcolor=#fefefe
| 464164 ||  || — || March 12, 2005 || Socorro || LINEAR || — || align=right | 1.1 km || 
|-id=165 bgcolor=#d6d6d6
| 464165 ||  || — || January 15, 2004 || Kitt Peak || Spacewatch || — || align=right | 3.6 km || 
|-id=166 bgcolor=#d6d6d6
| 464166 ||  || — || May 11, 2005 || Palomar || NEAT || Tj (2.99) || align=right | 3.7 km || 
|-id=167 bgcolor=#d6d6d6
| 464167 ||  || — || December 20, 2004 || Mount Lemmon || Mount Lemmon Survey || EOS || align=right | 2.1 km || 
|-id=168 bgcolor=#E9E9E9
| 464168 ||  || — || October 13, 1999 || Apache Point || SDSS || — || align=right | 2.3 km || 
|-id=169 bgcolor=#d6d6d6
| 464169 ||  || — || October 20, 2003 || Kitt Peak || Spacewatch || THM || align=right | 2.3 km || 
|-id=170 bgcolor=#fefefe
| 464170 ||  || — || September 20, 2003 || Palomar || NEAT || — || align=right | 1.0 km || 
|-id=171 bgcolor=#E9E9E9
| 464171 ||  || — || March 12, 2002 || Kitt Peak || Spacewatch || AGN || align=right | 1.5 km || 
|-id=172 bgcolor=#E9E9E9
| 464172 ||  || — || January 21, 2006 || Mount Lemmon || Mount Lemmon Survey || HOF || align=right | 3.1 km || 
|-id=173 bgcolor=#d6d6d6
| 464173 ||  || — || November 21, 2009 || Mount Lemmon || Mount Lemmon Survey || — || align=right | 3.3 km || 
|-id=174 bgcolor=#d6d6d6
| 464174 ||  || — || February 13, 2004 || Kitt Peak || Spacewatch || — || align=right | 4.5 km || 
|-id=175 bgcolor=#E9E9E9
| 464175 ||  || — || January 28, 2006 || Kitt Peak || Spacewatch || AGN || align=right | 1.4 km || 
|-id=176 bgcolor=#E9E9E9
| 464176 ||  || — || July 28, 2008 || Siding Spring || SSS || — || align=right | 2.3 km || 
|-id=177 bgcolor=#d6d6d6
| 464177 ||  || — || March 16, 2010 || Catalina || CSS || Tj (2.98) || align=right | 3.7 km || 
|-id=178 bgcolor=#E9E9E9
| 464178 ||  || — || February 27, 2006 || Kitt Peak || Spacewatch || — || align=right | 2.1 km || 
|-id=179 bgcolor=#d6d6d6
| 464179 ||  || — || January 15, 2004 || Kitt Peak || Spacewatch || — || align=right | 4.7 km || 
|-id=180 bgcolor=#E9E9E9
| 464180 ||  || — || September 12, 2001 || Socorro || LINEAR || — || align=right | 1.1 km || 
|-id=181 bgcolor=#d6d6d6
| 464181 ||  || — || December 18, 2003 || Kitt Peak || Spacewatch || — || align=right | 4.0 km || 
|-id=182 bgcolor=#E9E9E9
| 464182 ||  || — || October 28, 2005 || Catalina || CSS || — || align=right | 1.8 km || 
|-id=183 bgcolor=#d6d6d6
| 464183 ||  || — || September 18, 1995 || Kitt Peak || Spacewatch || VER || align=right | 2.7 km || 
|-id=184 bgcolor=#E9E9E9
| 464184 ||  || — || March 14, 2007 || Kitt Peak || Spacewatch || — || align=right | 3.0 km || 
|-id=185 bgcolor=#E9E9E9
| 464185 ||  || — || May 10, 2007 || Kitt Peak || Spacewatch || — || align=right | 3.4 km || 
|-id=186 bgcolor=#d6d6d6
| 464186 ||  || — || December 31, 1997 || Kitt Peak || Spacewatch || — || align=right | 4.5 km || 
|-id=187 bgcolor=#d6d6d6
| 464187 ||  || — || September 27, 2003 || Apache Point || SDSS || — || align=right | 2.5 km || 
|-id=188 bgcolor=#d6d6d6
| 464188 ||  || — || March 13, 2008 || Kitt Peak || Spacewatch || 3:2 || align=right | 3.5 km || 
|-id=189 bgcolor=#d6d6d6
| 464189 ||  || — || September 16, 2013 || Mount Lemmon || Mount Lemmon Survey || — || align=right | 3.7 km || 
|-id=190 bgcolor=#d6d6d6
| 464190 ||  || — || September 14, 2007 || Catalina || CSS || — || align=right | 4.5 km || 
|-id=191 bgcolor=#fefefe
| 464191 ||  || — || March 27, 1995 || Kitt Peak || Spacewatch || — || align=right data-sort-value="0.94" | 940 m || 
|-id=192 bgcolor=#d6d6d6
| 464192 ||  || — || September 30, 2003 || Apache Point || SDSS || — || align=right | 2.7 km || 
|-id=193 bgcolor=#d6d6d6
| 464193 ||  || — || January 19, 2004 || Kitt Peak || Spacewatch || EOS || align=right | 1.9 km || 
|-id=194 bgcolor=#d6d6d6
| 464194 ||  || — || April 5, 2000 || Socorro || LINEAR || — || align=right | 2.9 km || 
|-id=195 bgcolor=#d6d6d6
| 464195 ||  || — || September 15, 2013 || Mount Lemmon || Mount Lemmon Survey || — || align=right | 3.4 km || 
|-id=196 bgcolor=#d6d6d6
| 464196 ||  || — || October 25, 2008 || Mount Lemmon || Mount Lemmon Survey || — || align=right | 3.0 km || 
|-id=197 bgcolor=#fefefe
| 464197 ||  || — || April 15, 2004 || Kitt Peak || Spacewatch || — || align=right | 1.2 km || 
|-id=198 bgcolor=#E9E9E9
| 464198 ||  || — || September 30, 2000 || Socorro || LINEAR || ADE || align=right | 2.4 km || 
|-id=199 bgcolor=#E9E9E9
| 464199 ||  || — || February 7, 2003 || Palomar || NEAT || — || align=right | 1.0 km || 
|-id=200 bgcolor=#E9E9E9
| 464200 ||  || — || September 27, 2009 || Mount Lemmon || Mount Lemmon Survey || — || align=right | 1.7 km || 
|}

464201–464300 

|-bgcolor=#d6d6d6
| 464201 ||  || — || October 8, 2007 || Catalina || CSS || — || align=right | 3.8 km || 
|-id=202 bgcolor=#d6d6d6
| 464202 ||  || — || February 25, 2006 || Kitt Peak || Spacewatch || — || align=right | 2.2 km || 
|-id=203 bgcolor=#d6d6d6
| 464203 ||  || — || May 23, 2006 || Kitt Peak || Spacewatch || EOS || align=right | 1.8 km || 
|-id=204 bgcolor=#d6d6d6
| 464204 ||  || — || September 10, 2007 || Mount Lemmon || Mount Lemmon Survey || — || align=right | 3.3 km || 
|-id=205 bgcolor=#d6d6d6
| 464205 ||  || — || March 20, 2010 || Mount Lemmon || Mount Lemmon Survey || EOS || align=right | 3.8 km || 
|-id=206 bgcolor=#d6d6d6
| 464206 ||  || — || October 6, 2005 || Mount Lemmon || Mount Lemmon Survey || 3:2 || align=right | 3.6 km || 
|-id=207 bgcolor=#d6d6d6
| 464207 ||  || — || September 3, 2002 || Palomar || NEAT || — || align=right | 4.0 km || 
|-id=208 bgcolor=#d6d6d6
| 464208 ||  || — || February 3, 2009 || Kitt Peak || Spacewatch || — || align=right | 5.1 km || 
|-id=209 bgcolor=#d6d6d6
| 464209 ||  || — || May 6, 2005 || Mount Lemmon || Mount Lemmon Survey || — || align=right | 2.8 km || 
|-id=210 bgcolor=#E9E9E9
| 464210 ||  || — || November 16, 2009 || Mount Lemmon || Mount Lemmon Survey || — || align=right | 1.3 km || 
|-id=211 bgcolor=#d6d6d6
| 464211 ||  || — || December 24, 2006 || Mount Lemmon || Mount Lemmon Survey || SHU3:2 || align=right | 5.5 km || 
|-id=212 bgcolor=#d6d6d6
| 464212 ||  || — || September 12, 2007 || Mount Lemmon || Mount Lemmon Survey || THM || align=right | 2.4 km || 
|-id=213 bgcolor=#E9E9E9
| 464213 ||  || — || February 7, 2011 || Mount Lemmon || Mount Lemmon Survey || — || align=right data-sort-value="0.93" | 930 m || 
|-id=214 bgcolor=#E9E9E9
| 464214 ||  || — || September 7, 2008 || Mount Lemmon || Mount Lemmon Survey || — || align=right | 2.0 km || 
|-id=215 bgcolor=#E9E9E9
| 464215 ||  || — || January 14, 2002 || Socorro || LINEAR || — || align=right | 2.7 km || 
|-id=216 bgcolor=#d6d6d6
| 464216 ||  || — || December 1, 2003 || Kitt Peak || Spacewatch || — || align=right | 2.5 km || 
|-id=217 bgcolor=#d6d6d6
| 464217 ||  || — || November 21, 2009 || Mount Lemmon || Mount Lemmon Survey || EOS || align=right | 2.7 km || 
|-id=218 bgcolor=#E9E9E9
| 464218 ||  || — || October 4, 2005 || Mount Lemmon || Mount Lemmon Survey || — || align=right | 1.1 km || 
|-id=219 bgcolor=#d6d6d6
| 464219 ||  || — || September 10, 2007 || Mount Lemmon || Mount Lemmon Survey || — || align=right | 2.5 km || 
|-id=220 bgcolor=#E9E9E9
| 464220 ||  || — || January 10, 2006 || Mount Lemmon || Mount Lemmon Survey || — || align=right | 2.3 km || 
|-id=221 bgcolor=#d6d6d6
| 464221 ||  || — || February 14, 2010 || Mount Lemmon || Mount Lemmon Survey || — || align=right | 3.9 km || 
|-id=222 bgcolor=#d6d6d6
| 464222 ||  || — || May 27, 2006 || Catalina || CSS || — || align=right | 4.4 km || 
|-id=223 bgcolor=#E9E9E9
| 464223 ||  || — || November 30, 2005 || Mount Lemmon || Mount Lemmon Survey || — || align=right | 1.9 km || 
|-id=224 bgcolor=#d6d6d6
| 464224 ||  || — || April 19, 2006 || Kitt Peak || Spacewatch || — || align=right | 2.5 km || 
|-id=225 bgcolor=#d6d6d6
| 464225 ||  || — || February 19, 2010 || Mount Lemmon || Mount Lemmon Survey || — || align=right | 2.9 km || 
|-id=226 bgcolor=#E9E9E9
| 464226 ||  || — || November 11, 2001 || Apache Point || SDSS || — || align=right data-sort-value="0.93" | 930 m || 
|-id=227 bgcolor=#E9E9E9
| 464227 ||  || — || April 20, 2007 || Mount Lemmon || Mount Lemmon Survey || — || align=right | 3.5 km || 
|-id=228 bgcolor=#E9E9E9
| 464228 ||  || — || November 27, 2009 || Mount Lemmon || Mount Lemmon Survey || — || align=right | 2.8 km || 
|-id=229 bgcolor=#d6d6d6
| 464229 ||  || — || August 23, 2007 || Kitt Peak || Spacewatch || EOS || align=right | 2.3 km || 
|-id=230 bgcolor=#d6d6d6
| 464230 ||  || — || September 13, 2007 || Mount Lemmon || Mount Lemmon Survey || — || align=right | 3.1 km || 
|-id=231 bgcolor=#d6d6d6
| 464231 ||  || — || January 18, 2005 || Kitt Peak || Spacewatch || — || align=right | 4.3 km || 
|-id=232 bgcolor=#E9E9E9
| 464232 ||  || — || February 7, 2002 || Kitt Peak || Spacewatch || — || align=right | 2.5 km || 
|-id=233 bgcolor=#E9E9E9
| 464233 ||  || — || November 28, 2005 || Mount Lemmon || Mount Lemmon Survey || — || align=right | 1.6 km || 
|-id=234 bgcolor=#E9E9E9
| 464234 ||  || — || August 8, 2004 || Socorro || LINEAR || — || align=right | 1.2 km || 
|-id=235 bgcolor=#d6d6d6
| 464235 ||  || — || January 19, 1994 || Kitt Peak || Spacewatch || — || align=right | 2.7 km || 
|-id=236 bgcolor=#d6d6d6
| 464236 ||  || — || September 15, 2006 || Kitt Peak || Spacewatch || — || align=right | 3.8 km || 
|-id=237 bgcolor=#d6d6d6
| 464237 ||  || — || June 1, 2010 || WISE || WISE || — || align=right | 3.6 km || 
|-id=238 bgcolor=#d6d6d6
| 464238 ||  || — || October 15, 2007 || Mount Lemmon || Mount Lemmon Survey || — || align=right | 3.5 km || 
|-id=239 bgcolor=#d6d6d6
| 464239 ||  || — || January 15, 1996 || Kitt Peak || Spacewatch || 7:4 || align=right | 4.2 km || 
|-id=240 bgcolor=#d6d6d6
| 464240 ||  || — || March 13, 2010 || Mount Lemmon || Mount Lemmon Survey || HYG || align=right | 2.5 km || 
|-id=241 bgcolor=#d6d6d6
| 464241 ||  || — || August 13, 2006 || Palomar || NEAT || — || align=right | 4.2 km || 
|-id=242 bgcolor=#d6d6d6
| 464242 ||  || — || November 13, 1996 || Kitt Peak || Spacewatch || THM || align=right | 3.2 km || 
|-id=243 bgcolor=#E9E9E9
| 464243 ||  || — || March 3, 2006 || Mount Lemmon || Mount Lemmon Survey || — || align=right | 2.4 km || 
|-id=244 bgcolor=#E9E9E9
| 464244 ||  || — || December 16, 2009 || Mount Lemmon || Mount Lemmon Survey || HOF || align=right | 3.3 km || 
|-id=245 bgcolor=#d6d6d6
| 464245 ||  || — || October 23, 1997 || Kitt Peak || Spacewatch || EOS || align=right | 2.0 km || 
|-id=246 bgcolor=#d6d6d6
| 464246 ||  || — || January 1, 2009 || Mount Lemmon || Mount Lemmon Survey || — || align=right | 3.3 km || 
|-id=247 bgcolor=#fefefe
| 464247 ||  || — || November 30, 1999 || Kitt Peak || Spacewatch || V || align=right data-sort-value="0.85" | 850 m || 
|-id=248 bgcolor=#d6d6d6
| 464248 ||  || — || December 22, 2003 || Kitt Peak || Spacewatch || — || align=right | 3.1 km || 
|-id=249 bgcolor=#d6d6d6
| 464249 ||  || — || March 12, 2010 || Mount Lemmon || Mount Lemmon Survey || VER || align=right | 2.5 km || 
|-id=250 bgcolor=#d6d6d6
| 464250 ||  || — || March 9, 2005 || Kitt Peak || Spacewatch || — || align=right | 2.7 km || 
|-id=251 bgcolor=#d6d6d6
| 464251 ||  || — || November 1, 2006 || Mount Lemmon || Mount Lemmon Survey || 3:2 || align=right | 5.1 km || 
|-id=252 bgcolor=#d6d6d6
| 464252 ||  || — || September 9, 2007 || Kitt Peak || Spacewatch || — || align=right | 3.2 km || 
|-id=253 bgcolor=#E9E9E9
| 464253 ||  || — || December 10, 2005 || Kitt Peak || Spacewatch || — || align=right | 2.0 km || 
|-id=254 bgcolor=#d6d6d6
| 464254 ||  || — || November 6, 2008 || Kitt Peak || Spacewatch || EOS || align=right | 2.3 km || 
|-id=255 bgcolor=#d6d6d6
| 464255 ||  || — || September 11, 2007 || Mount Lemmon || Mount Lemmon Survey || EOS || align=right | 2.1 km || 
|-id=256 bgcolor=#d6d6d6
| 464256 ||  || — || March 19, 2010 || Kitt Peak || Spacewatch || — || align=right | 3.4 km || 
|-id=257 bgcolor=#d6d6d6
| 464257 ||  || — || August 12, 2007 || XuYi || PMO NEO || EOS || align=right | 2.3 km || 
|-id=258 bgcolor=#d6d6d6
| 464258 ||  || — || November 29, 2003 || Kitt Peak || Spacewatch || EOS || align=right | 1.8 km || 
|-id=259 bgcolor=#d6d6d6
| 464259 ||  || — || December 2, 2008 || Mount Lemmon || Mount Lemmon Survey || — || align=right | 3.3 km || 
|-id=260 bgcolor=#d6d6d6
| 464260 ||  || — || March 18, 2004 || Apache Point || SDSS || EOS || align=right | 2.6 km || 
|-id=261 bgcolor=#d6d6d6
| 464261 ||  || — || December 21, 2008 || Mount Lemmon || Mount Lemmon Survey || — || align=right | 2.8 km || 
|-id=262 bgcolor=#d6d6d6
| 464262 ||  || — || March 20, 2010 || Mount Lemmon || Mount Lemmon Survey || — || align=right | 3.9 km || 
|-id=263 bgcolor=#d6d6d6
| 464263 ||  || — || March 3, 2000 || Kitt Peak || Spacewatch || — || align=right | 2.3 km || 
|-id=264 bgcolor=#E9E9E9
| 464264 ||  || — || December 8, 2004 || Socorro || LINEAR || — || align=right | 3.3 km || 
|-id=265 bgcolor=#d6d6d6
| 464265 ||  || — || October 5, 2002 || Kitt Peak || Spacewatch || — || align=right | 2.4 km || 
|-id=266 bgcolor=#d6d6d6
| 464266 ||  || — || September 18, 2007 || Catalina || CSS || — || align=right | 3.3 km || 
|-id=267 bgcolor=#E9E9E9
| 464267 ||  || — || January 7, 2006 || Kitt Peak || Spacewatch || — || align=right | 3.1 km || 
|-id=268 bgcolor=#C2FFFF
| 464268 ||  || — || September 17, 2009 || Kitt Peak || Spacewatch || L4 || align=right | 9.9 km || 
|-id=269 bgcolor=#E9E9E9
| 464269 ||  || — || December 17, 2012 || Kislovodsk || ASC-Kislovodsk || — || align=right | 1.5 km || 
|-id=270 bgcolor=#fefefe
| 464270 ||  || — || September 28, 2008 || Mount Lemmon || Mount Lemmon Survey || — || align=right data-sort-value="0.78" | 780 m || 
|-id=271 bgcolor=#FA8072
| 464271 ||  || — || September 17, 1996 || Haleakala || NEAT || — || align=right data-sort-value="0.71" | 710 m || 
|-id=272 bgcolor=#E9E9E9
| 464272 ||  || — || February 23, 1998 || Kitt Peak || Spacewatch ||  || align=right | 2.1 km || 
|-id=273 bgcolor=#E9E9E9
| 464273 ||  || — || January 19, 1996 || Xinglong || SCAP || — || align=right | 1.2 km || 
|-id=274 bgcolor=#d6d6d6
| 464274 ||  || — || May 8, 2008 || Kitt Peak || Spacewatch || — || align=right | 2.9 km || 
|-id=275 bgcolor=#d6d6d6
| 464275 ||  || — || March 6, 1994 || Kitt Peak || Spacewatch || — || align=right | 3.3 km || 
|-id=276 bgcolor=#E9E9E9
| 464276 ||  || — || November 28, 2005 || Mount Lemmon || Mount Lemmon Survey || GEF || align=right | 1.3 km || 
|-id=277 bgcolor=#d6d6d6
| 464277 ||  || — || March 10, 2005 || Anderson Mesa || LONEOS || — || align=right | 4.9 km || 
|-id=278 bgcolor=#fefefe
| 464278 ||  || — || December 16, 2007 || Mount Lemmon || Mount Lemmon Survey || H || align=right data-sort-value="0.94" | 940 m || 
|-id=279 bgcolor=#d6d6d6
| 464279 ||  || — || February 7, 2010 || WISE || WISE || — || align=right | 3.2 km || 
|-id=280 bgcolor=#E9E9E9
| 464280 ||  || — || April 1, 2008 || Mount Lemmon || Mount Lemmon Survey || — || align=right | 1.5 km || 
|-id=281 bgcolor=#d6d6d6
| 464281 ||  || — || February 1, 2005 || Kitt Peak || Spacewatch || THM || align=right | 2.9 km || 
|-id=282 bgcolor=#E9E9E9
| 464282 ||  || — || April 28, 2004 || Kitt Peak || Spacewatch || — || align=right | 1.7 km || 
|-id=283 bgcolor=#d6d6d6
| 464283 ||  || — || January 7, 2006 || Mount Lemmon || Mount Lemmon Survey || EOS || align=right | 1.6 km || 
|-id=284 bgcolor=#E9E9E9
| 464284 ||  || — || October 8, 2005 || Kitt Peak || Spacewatch || — || align=right | 2.4 km || 
|-id=285 bgcolor=#d6d6d6
| 464285 ||  || — || March 2, 2006 || Mount Lemmon || Mount Lemmon Survey || — || align=right | 3.6 km || 
|-id=286 bgcolor=#d6d6d6
| 464286 ||  || — || March 8, 2005 || Mount Lemmon || Mount Lemmon Survey || — || align=right | 3.3 km || 
|-id=287 bgcolor=#d6d6d6
| 464287 ||  || — || May 2, 2006 || Mount Lemmon || Mount Lemmon Survey || — || align=right | 2.9 km || 
|-id=288 bgcolor=#d6d6d6
| 464288 ||  || — || January 13, 2005 || Kitt Peak || Spacewatch || — || align=right | 2.7 km || 
|-id=289 bgcolor=#d6d6d6
| 464289 ||  || — || September 24, 2008 || Mount Lemmon || Mount Lemmon Survey || — || align=right | 2.7 km || 
|-id=290 bgcolor=#d6d6d6
| 464290 ||  || — || March 11, 2010 || WISE || WISE || EOS || align=right | 1.7 km || 
|-id=291 bgcolor=#fefefe
| 464291 ||  || — || October 19, 2011 || Mount Lemmon || Mount Lemmon Survey || — || align=right data-sort-value="0.55" | 550 m || 
|-id=292 bgcolor=#E9E9E9
| 464292 ||  || — || March 10, 2007 || Kitt Peak || Spacewatch || — || align=right | 2.2 km || 
|-id=293 bgcolor=#fefefe
| 464293 ||  || — || October 3, 2003 || Kitt Peak || Spacewatch || — || align=right data-sort-value="0.83" | 830 m || 
|-id=294 bgcolor=#fefefe
| 464294 ||  || — || December 26, 2011 || Kitt Peak || Spacewatch || — || align=right data-sort-value="0.77" | 770 m || 
|-id=295 bgcolor=#d6d6d6
| 464295 ||  || — || April 7, 2010 || WISE || WISE || — || align=right | 4.2 km || 
|-id=296 bgcolor=#fefefe
| 464296 ||  || — || December 28, 2007 || Kitt Peak || Spacewatch || — || align=right data-sort-value="0.89" | 890 m || 
|-id=297 bgcolor=#fefefe
| 464297 ||  || — || March 2, 2006 || Kitt Peak || Spacewatch || — || align=right data-sort-value="0.58" | 580 m || 
|-id=298 bgcolor=#E9E9E9
| 464298 ||  || — || September 15, 2009 || Kitt Peak || Spacewatch || — || align=right | 1.6 km || 
|-id=299 bgcolor=#E9E9E9
| 464299 ||  || — || December 13, 2006 || Socorro || LINEAR || — || align=right | 1.5 km || 
|-id=300 bgcolor=#E9E9E9
| 464300 ||  || — || April 8, 2003 || Kitt Peak || Spacewatch || — || align=right | 1.8 km || 
|}

464301–464400 

|-bgcolor=#d6d6d6
| 464301 ||  || — || November 11, 2009 || Mount Lemmon || Mount Lemmon Survey || — || align=right | 1.9 km || 
|-id=302 bgcolor=#d6d6d6
| 464302 ||  || — || December 25, 2005 || Kitt Peak || Spacewatch || — || align=right | 2.1 km || 
|-id=303 bgcolor=#E9E9E9
| 464303 ||  || — || November 3, 2005 || Mount Lemmon || Mount Lemmon Survey || — || align=right | 2.4 km || 
|-id=304 bgcolor=#d6d6d6
| 464304 ||  || — || November 9, 2009 || Catalina || CSS || — || align=right | 3.8 km || 
|-id=305 bgcolor=#E9E9E9
| 464305 ||  || — || December 3, 2010 || Kitt Peak || Spacewatch || — || align=right | 2.1 km || 
|-id=306 bgcolor=#E9E9E9
| 464306 ||  || — || September 12, 2002 || Palomar || NEAT || — || align=right data-sort-value="0.75" | 750 m || 
|-id=307 bgcolor=#d6d6d6
| 464307 ||  || — || January 26, 2006 || Kitt Peak || Spacewatch || — || align=right | 3.1 km || 
|-id=308 bgcolor=#E9E9E9
| 464308 ||  || — || November 1, 2005 || Mount Lemmon || Mount Lemmon Survey || PAD || align=right | 1.5 km || 
|-id=309 bgcolor=#d6d6d6
| 464309 ||  || — || December 4, 2005 || Kitt Peak || Spacewatch || — || align=right | 3.5 km || 
|-id=310 bgcolor=#E9E9E9
| 464310 ||  || — || November 12, 2010 || Mount Lemmon || Mount Lemmon Survey || — || align=right | 1.6 km || 
|-id=311 bgcolor=#E9E9E9
| 464311 ||  || — || April 7, 2008 || Catalina || CSS || JUN || align=right | 1.1 km || 
|-id=312 bgcolor=#E9E9E9
| 464312 ||  || — || July 24, 2000 || Kitt Peak || Spacewatch || — || align=right | 2.2 km || 
|-id=313 bgcolor=#d6d6d6
| 464313 ||  || — || September 9, 2008 || Catalina || CSS || Tj (2.99) || align=right | 3.0 km || 
|-id=314 bgcolor=#fefefe
| 464314 ||  || — || November 27, 2011 || Mount Lemmon || Mount Lemmon Survey || — || align=right data-sort-value="0.74" | 740 m || 
|-id=315 bgcolor=#d6d6d6
| 464315 ||  || — || February 22, 2006 || Catalina || CSS || — || align=right | 2.4 km || 
|-id=316 bgcolor=#d6d6d6
| 464316 ||  || — || November 20, 2009 || Kitt Peak || Spacewatch || — || align=right | 2.1 km || 
|-id=317 bgcolor=#E9E9E9
| 464317 ||  || — || February 23, 2007 || Kitt Peak || Spacewatch || — || align=right | 2.3 km || 
|-id=318 bgcolor=#E9E9E9
| 464318 ||  || — || December 24, 2006 || Kitt Peak || Spacewatch || — || align=right | 1.5 km || 
|-id=319 bgcolor=#fefefe
| 464319 ||  || — || February 2, 2009 || Kitt Peak || Spacewatch || — || align=right data-sort-value="0.73" | 730 m || 
|-id=320 bgcolor=#d6d6d6
| 464320 ||  || — || December 30, 2005 || Kitt Peak || Spacewatch || — || align=right | 1.9 km || 
|-id=321 bgcolor=#E9E9E9
| 464321 ||  || — || February 25, 2012 || Kitt Peak || Spacewatch || — || align=right | 1.6 km || 
|-id=322 bgcolor=#fefefe
| 464322 ||  || — || March 4, 2005 || Mount Lemmon || Mount Lemmon Survey || — || align=right data-sort-value="0.79" | 790 m || 
|-id=323 bgcolor=#fefefe
| 464323 ||  || — || September 12, 2007 || Mount Lemmon || Mount Lemmon Survey || — || align=right data-sort-value="0.72" | 720 m || 
|-id=324 bgcolor=#E9E9E9
| 464324 ||  || — || August 28, 2005 || Kitt Peak || Spacewatch || EUN || align=right | 1.3 km || 
|-id=325 bgcolor=#d6d6d6
| 464325 ||  || — || February 16, 2010 || Kitt Peak || Spacewatch || 7:4 || align=right | 3.0 km || 
|-id=326 bgcolor=#fefefe
| 464326 ||  || — || March 4, 2005 || Kitt Peak || Spacewatch || — || align=right data-sort-value="0.87" | 870 m || 
|-id=327 bgcolor=#fefefe
| 464327 ||  || — || April 9, 1997 || Kitt Peak || Spacewatch || — || align=right data-sort-value="0.89" | 890 m || 
|-id=328 bgcolor=#E9E9E9
| 464328 ||  || — || March 20, 1999 || Apache Point || SDSS || — || align=right | 1.3 km || 
|-id=329 bgcolor=#E9E9E9
| 464329 ||  || — || January 16, 2003 || Palomar || NEAT || — || align=right | 1.5 km || 
|-id=330 bgcolor=#d6d6d6
| 464330 ||  || — || January 26, 2006 || Mount Lemmon || Mount Lemmon Survey || KOR || align=right | 1.2 km || 
|-id=331 bgcolor=#fefefe
| 464331 ||  || — || November 1, 1999 || Kitt Peak || Spacewatch || NYS || align=right data-sort-value="0.69" | 690 m || 
|-id=332 bgcolor=#E9E9E9
| 464332 ||  || — || July 29, 2010 || WISE || WISE || — || align=right | 1.8 km || 
|-id=333 bgcolor=#d6d6d6
| 464333 ||  || — || March 23, 2012 || Mount Lemmon || Mount Lemmon Survey || — || align=right | 3.1 km || 
|-id=334 bgcolor=#d6d6d6
| 464334 ||  || — || January 17, 2005 || Catalina || CSS || — || align=right | 3.7 km || 
|-id=335 bgcolor=#E9E9E9
| 464335 ||  || — || October 30, 2005 || Kitt Peak || Spacewatch || — || align=right | 2.4 km || 
|-id=336 bgcolor=#E9E9E9
| 464336 ||  || — || November 14, 2006 || Kitt Peak || Spacewatch || — || align=right | 1.2 km || 
|-id=337 bgcolor=#fefefe
| 464337 ||  || — || December 29, 2011 || Kitt Peak || Spacewatch || — || align=right data-sort-value="0.74" | 740 m || 
|-id=338 bgcolor=#fefefe
| 464338 ||  || — || December 1, 2008 || Mount Lemmon || Mount Lemmon Survey || — || align=right | 1.0 km || 
|-id=339 bgcolor=#d6d6d6
| 464339 ||  || — || May 1, 2012 || Mount Lemmon || Mount Lemmon Survey || — || align=right | 2.0 km || 
|-id=340 bgcolor=#d6d6d6
| 464340 ||  || — || February 20, 2006 || Kitt Peak || Spacewatch || — || align=right | 2.1 km || 
|-id=341 bgcolor=#E9E9E9
| 464341 ||  || — || August 9, 2010 || WISE || WISE || — || align=right | 2.8 km || 
|-id=342 bgcolor=#fefefe
| 464342 ||  || — || January 19, 2005 || Kitt Peak || Spacewatch || — || align=right data-sort-value="0.96" | 960 m || 
|-id=343 bgcolor=#fefefe
| 464343 ||  || — || January 28, 2000 || Kitt Peak || Spacewatch || H || align=right data-sort-value="0.56" | 560 m || 
|-id=344 bgcolor=#d6d6d6
| 464344 ||  || — || April 19, 2007 || Kitt Peak || Spacewatch || KOR || align=right | 1.5 km || 
|-id=345 bgcolor=#E9E9E9
| 464345 ||  || — || September 15, 2010 || Mount Lemmon || Mount Lemmon Survey || (5) || align=right data-sort-value="0.61" | 610 m || 
|-id=346 bgcolor=#d6d6d6
| 464346 ||  || — || January 30, 2006 || Kitt Peak || Spacewatch || — || align=right | 2.0 km || 
|-id=347 bgcolor=#d6d6d6
| 464347 ||  || — || December 20, 2004 || Mount Lemmon || Mount Lemmon Survey || — || align=right | 2.4 km || 
|-id=348 bgcolor=#E9E9E9
| 464348 ||  || — || February 10, 2002 || Socorro || LINEAR || — || align=right | 2.8 km || 
|-id=349 bgcolor=#d6d6d6
| 464349 ||  || — || March 9, 2005 || Mount Lemmon || Mount Lemmon Survey || — || align=right | 2.3 km || 
|-id=350 bgcolor=#d6d6d6
| 464350 ||  || — || May 24, 2001 || Apache Point || SDSS || — || align=right | 2.3 km || 
|-id=351 bgcolor=#d6d6d6
| 464351 ||  || — || March 9, 2011 || Mount Lemmon || Mount Lemmon Survey || — || align=right | 2.6 km || 
|-id=352 bgcolor=#E9E9E9
| 464352 ||  || — || July 15, 2005 || Mount Lemmon || Mount Lemmon Survey || — || align=right | 1.0 km || 
|-id=353 bgcolor=#fefefe
| 464353 ||  || — || October 20, 2011 || Kitt Peak || Spacewatch || — || align=right data-sort-value="0.54" | 540 m || 
|-id=354 bgcolor=#d6d6d6
| 464354 ||  || — || September 28, 2008 || Catalina || CSS || — || align=right | 4.0 km || 
|-id=355 bgcolor=#d6d6d6
| 464355 ||  || — || February 2, 2005 || Kitt Peak || Spacewatch || — || align=right | 3.8 km || 
|-id=356 bgcolor=#E9E9E9
| 464356 ||  || — || November 3, 2010 || Mount Lemmon || Mount Lemmon Survey || — || align=right | 1.6 km || 
|-id=357 bgcolor=#E9E9E9
| 464357 ||  || — || August 29, 2005 || Kitt Peak || Spacewatch || — || align=right | 1.6 km || 
|-id=358 bgcolor=#d6d6d6
| 464358 ||  || — || November 26, 2000 || Socorro || LINEAR || — || align=right | 2.5 km || 
|-id=359 bgcolor=#E9E9E9
| 464359 ||  || — || March 31, 2008 || Mount Lemmon || Mount Lemmon Survey || — || align=right | 2.5 km || 
|-id=360 bgcolor=#d6d6d6
| 464360 ||  || — || September 29, 2009 || Mount Lemmon || Mount Lemmon Survey || EOS || align=right | 1.3 km || 
|-id=361 bgcolor=#d6d6d6
| 464361 ||  || — || March 8, 2005 || Kitt Peak || Spacewatch || — || align=right | 2.6 km || 
|-id=362 bgcolor=#E9E9E9
| 464362 ||  || — || April 29, 2000 || Socorro || LINEAR || — || align=right | 1.7 km || 
|-id=363 bgcolor=#E9E9E9
| 464363 ||  || — || June 8, 2013 || Mount Lemmon || Mount Lemmon Survey || — || align=right | 1.0 km || 
|-id=364 bgcolor=#d6d6d6
| 464364 ||  || — || January 16, 2005 || Kitt Peak || Spacewatch || EOS || align=right | 2.6 km || 
|-id=365 bgcolor=#E9E9E9
| 464365 ||  || — || December 16, 2006 || Kitt Peak || Spacewatch || EUN || align=right | 1.1 km || 
|-id=366 bgcolor=#d6d6d6
| 464366 ||  || — || May 4, 2006 || Kitt Peak || Spacewatch || — || align=right | 2.8 km || 
|-id=367 bgcolor=#d6d6d6
| 464367 ||  || — || September 7, 2008 || Mount Lemmon || Mount Lemmon Survey || — || align=right | 2.4 km || 
|-id=368 bgcolor=#E9E9E9
| 464368 ||  || — || October 23, 2006 || Mount Lemmon || Mount Lemmon Survey || — || align=right | 1.2 km || 
|-id=369 bgcolor=#d6d6d6
| 464369 ||  || — || June 3, 2008 || Mount Lemmon || Mount Lemmon Survey || BRA || align=right | 2.3 km || 
|-id=370 bgcolor=#d6d6d6
| 464370 ||  || — || March 12, 2010 || WISE || WISE || — || align=right | 3.9 km || 
|-id=371 bgcolor=#fefefe
| 464371 ||  || — || March 9, 2005 || Catalina || CSS || — || align=right | 1.3 km || 
|-id=372 bgcolor=#d6d6d6
| 464372 ||  || — || September 17, 2009 || Mount Lemmon || Mount Lemmon Survey || — || align=right | 2.2 km || 
|-id=373 bgcolor=#E9E9E9
| 464373 ||  || — || October 29, 2006 || Catalina || CSS || — || align=right | 2.6 km || 
|-id=374 bgcolor=#d6d6d6
| 464374 ||  || — || October 6, 2000 || Anderson Mesa || LONEOS || — || align=right | 2.0 km || 
|-id=375 bgcolor=#d6d6d6
| 464375 ||  || — || September 20, 2003 || Palomar || NEAT || — || align=right | 3.9 km || 
|-id=376 bgcolor=#d6d6d6
| 464376 ||  || — || October 10, 2002 || Apache Point || SDSS || — || align=right | 3.4 km || 
|-id=377 bgcolor=#d6d6d6
| 464377 ||  || — || October 29, 2003 || Kitt Peak || Spacewatch || TIR || align=right | 2.3 km || 
|-id=378 bgcolor=#E9E9E9
| 464378 ||  || — || October 1, 2005 || Mount Lemmon || Mount Lemmon Survey || GEF || align=right | 1.3 km || 
|-id=379 bgcolor=#E9E9E9
| 464379 ||  || — || December 14, 2010 || Mount Lemmon || Mount Lemmon Survey || — || align=right | 1.5 km || 
|-id=380 bgcolor=#fefefe
| 464380 ||  || — || February 4, 2005 || Kitt Peak || Spacewatch || — || align=right data-sort-value="0.77" | 770 m || 
|-id=381 bgcolor=#fefefe
| 464381 ||  || — || January 25, 2006 || Kitt Peak || Spacewatch || — || align=right data-sort-value="0.63" | 630 m || 
|-id=382 bgcolor=#d6d6d6
| 464382 ||  || — || November 21, 2009 || Catalina || CSS || — || align=right | 3.6 km || 
|-id=383 bgcolor=#d6d6d6
| 464383 ||  || — || March 9, 2010 || WISE || WISE || — || align=right | 2.9 km || 
|-id=384 bgcolor=#d6d6d6
| 464384 ||  || — || November 23, 2009 || Catalina || CSS || — || align=right | 3.7 km || 
|-id=385 bgcolor=#d6d6d6
| 464385 ||  || — || September 25, 2009 || Kitt Peak || Spacewatch || KOR || align=right | 1.4 km || 
|-id=386 bgcolor=#d6d6d6
| 464386 ||  || — || April 30, 2012 || Mount Lemmon || Mount Lemmon Survey || — || align=right | 3.5 km || 
|-id=387 bgcolor=#fefefe
| 464387 ||  || — || November 29, 2003 || Kitt Peak || Spacewatch || — || align=right data-sort-value="0.88" | 880 m || 
|-id=388 bgcolor=#fefefe
| 464388 ||  || — || April 7, 2013 || Kitt Peak || Spacewatch || — || align=right data-sort-value="0.71" | 710 m || 
|-id=389 bgcolor=#fefefe
| 464389 ||  || — || February 27, 2006 || Kitt Peak || Spacewatch || — || align=right data-sort-value="0.73" | 730 m || 
|-id=390 bgcolor=#d6d6d6
| 464390 ||  || — || March 11, 2005 || Anderson Mesa || LONEOS || — || align=right | 2.4 km || 
|-id=391 bgcolor=#d6d6d6
| 464391 ||  || — || March 8, 2005 || Mount Lemmon || Mount Lemmon Survey || THM || align=right | 1.8 km || 
|-id=392 bgcolor=#E9E9E9
| 464392 ||  || — || December 24, 2001 || Kitt Peak || Spacewatch || — || align=right | 2.9 km || 
|-id=393 bgcolor=#d6d6d6
| 464393 ||  || — || November 16, 2009 || Mount Lemmon || Mount Lemmon Survey || — || align=right | 3.2 km || 
|-id=394 bgcolor=#E9E9E9
| 464394 ||  || — || January 5, 2003 || Socorro || LINEAR || EUN || align=right | 1.3 km || 
|-id=395 bgcolor=#E9E9E9
| 464395 ||  || — || January 29, 1998 || Kitt Peak || Spacewatch || — || align=right | 1.8 km || 
|-id=396 bgcolor=#d6d6d6
| 464396 ||  || — || February 14, 1999 || Caussols || ODAS || — || align=right | 3.9 km || 
|-id=397 bgcolor=#d6d6d6
| 464397 ||  || — || February 12, 2000 || Apache Point || SDSS ||  || align=right | 3.6 km || 
|-id=398 bgcolor=#d6d6d6
| 464398 ||  || — || March 2, 1997 || Kitt Peak || Spacewatch || KOR || align=right | 1.6 km || 
|-id=399 bgcolor=#d6d6d6
| 464399 ||  || — || August 7, 2007 || Siding Spring || SSS || — || align=right | 4.2 km || 
|-id=400 bgcolor=#fefefe
| 464400 ||  || — || January 7, 2002 || Socorro || LINEAR || — || align=right | 1.4 km || 
|}

464401–464500 

|-bgcolor=#d6d6d6
| 464401 ||  || — || December 10, 2004 || Kitt Peak || Spacewatch || — || align=right | 4.2 km || 
|-id=402 bgcolor=#E9E9E9
| 464402 ||  || — || October 31, 2005 || Mount Lemmon || Mount Lemmon Survey || — || align=right | 1.9 km || 
|-id=403 bgcolor=#fefefe
| 464403 ||  || — || April 30, 1997 || Kitt Peak || Spacewatch || — || align=right data-sort-value="0.93" | 930 m || 
|-id=404 bgcolor=#E9E9E9
| 464404 ||  || — || December 13, 2006 || Kitt Peak || Spacewatch || — || align=right | 1.5 km || 
|-id=405 bgcolor=#fefefe
| 464405 ||  || — || October 13, 1999 || Apache Point || SDSS || — || align=right data-sort-value="0.86" | 860 m || 
|-id=406 bgcolor=#fefefe
| 464406 ||  || — || January 19, 2005 || Kitt Peak || Spacewatch || MAS || align=right data-sort-value="0.65" | 650 m || 
|-id=407 bgcolor=#d6d6d6
| 464407 ||  || — || December 14, 2010 || Mount Lemmon || Mount Lemmon Survey || — || align=right | 2.8 km || 
|-id=408 bgcolor=#d6d6d6
| 464408 ||  || — || May 6, 2006 || Kitt Peak || Spacewatch || — || align=right | 2.6 km || 
|-id=409 bgcolor=#d6d6d6
| 464409 ||  || — || December 20, 2004 || Mount Lemmon || Mount Lemmon Survey || THM || align=right | 2.1 km || 
|-id=410 bgcolor=#E9E9E9
| 464410 ||  || — || September 15, 2004 || Kitt Peak || Spacewatch || — || align=right | 3.1 km || 
|-id=411 bgcolor=#d6d6d6
| 464411 ||  || — || March 9, 2005 || Catalina || CSS || Tj (2.99) || align=right | 4.9 km || 
|-id=412 bgcolor=#E9E9E9
| 464412 ||  || — || January 27, 2012 || Mount Lemmon || Mount Lemmon Survey || — || align=right data-sort-value="0.76" | 760 m || 
|-id=413 bgcolor=#fefefe
| 464413 ||  || — || December 17, 2003 || Kitt Peak || Spacewatch || — || align=right data-sort-value="0.83" | 830 m || 
|-id=414 bgcolor=#d6d6d6
| 464414 ||  || — || December 20, 2009 || Mount Lemmon || Mount Lemmon Survey || — || align=right | 3.8 km || 
|-id=415 bgcolor=#fefefe
| 464415 ||  || — || October 17, 2003 || Kitt Peak || Spacewatch || — || align=right data-sort-value="0.88" | 880 m || 
|-id=416 bgcolor=#fefefe
| 464416 ||  || — || March 8, 2005 || Kitt Peak || Spacewatch || — || align=right data-sort-value="0.82" | 820 m || 
|-id=417 bgcolor=#fefefe
| 464417 ||  || — || September 28, 2003 || Kitt Peak || Spacewatch || NYS || align=right data-sort-value="0.65" | 650 m || 
|-id=418 bgcolor=#d6d6d6
| 464418 ||  || — || January 26, 2011 || Kitt Peak || Spacewatch || — || align=right | 2.3 km || 
|-id=419 bgcolor=#d6d6d6
| 464419 ||  || — || March 3, 2010 || WISE || WISE || LIX || align=right | 2.6 km || 
|-id=420 bgcolor=#d6d6d6
| 464420 ||  || — || December 20, 2004 || Mount Lemmon || Mount Lemmon Survey || — || align=right | 3.3 km || 
|-id=421 bgcolor=#d6d6d6
| 464421 ||  || — || September 6, 2008 || Mount Lemmon || Mount Lemmon Survey || LIX || align=right | 3.3 km || 
|-id=422 bgcolor=#d6d6d6
| 464422 ||  || — || September 9, 2008 || Mount Lemmon || Mount Lemmon Survey || EOS || align=right | 1.8 km || 
|-id=423 bgcolor=#E9E9E9
| 464423 ||  || — || September 27, 2009 || Mount Lemmon || Mount Lemmon Survey || — || align=right | 2.4 km || 
|-id=424 bgcolor=#E9E9E9
| 464424 ||  || — || March 11, 2008 || Kitt Peak || Spacewatch || — || align=right | 1.3 km || 
|-id=425 bgcolor=#d6d6d6
| 464425 ||  || — || March 30, 2011 || Mount Lemmon || Mount Lemmon Survey || — || align=right | 3.2 km || 
|-id=426 bgcolor=#E9E9E9
| 464426 ||  || — || November 24, 2006 || Mount Lemmon || Mount Lemmon Survey || — || align=right | 2.3 km || 
|-id=427 bgcolor=#d6d6d6
| 464427 ||  || — || October 21, 2009 || Mount Lemmon || Mount Lemmon Survey || — || align=right | 2.5 km || 
|-id=428 bgcolor=#d6d6d6
| 464428 ||  || — || February 8, 2010 || WISE || WISE || — || align=right | 3.8 km || 
|-id=429 bgcolor=#E9E9E9
| 464429 ||  || — || October 26, 2005 || Kitt Peak || Spacewatch || — || align=right | 2.2 km || 
|-id=430 bgcolor=#E9E9E9
| 464430 ||  || — || March 13, 2008 || Mount Lemmon || Mount Lemmon Survey || — || align=right data-sort-value="0.67" | 670 m || 
|-id=431 bgcolor=#fefefe
| 464431 ||  || — || March 10, 2005 || Mount Lemmon || Mount Lemmon Survey || — || align=right data-sort-value="0.63" | 630 m || 
|-id=432 bgcolor=#d6d6d6
| 464432 ||  || — || October 8, 2004 || Kitt Peak || Spacewatch || — || align=right | 2.3 km || 
|-id=433 bgcolor=#fefefe
| 464433 ||  || — || September 26, 2003 || Apache Point || SDSS || V || align=right data-sort-value="0.57" | 570 m || 
|-id=434 bgcolor=#E9E9E9
| 464434 ||  || — || January 25, 2007 || Kitt Peak || Spacewatch || — || align=right | 3.0 km || 
|-id=435 bgcolor=#d6d6d6
| 464435 ||  || — || April 14, 2001 || Kitt Peak || Spacewatch || — || align=right | 3.3 km || 
|-id=436 bgcolor=#d6d6d6
| 464436 ||  || — || December 14, 2010 || Mount Lemmon || Mount Lemmon Survey || — || align=right | 3.5 km || 
|-id=437 bgcolor=#fefefe
| 464437 ||  || — || September 11, 2007 || Mount Lemmon || Mount Lemmon Survey || — || align=right data-sort-value="0.70" | 700 m || 
|-id=438 bgcolor=#fefefe
| 464438 ||  || — || December 17, 2001 || Socorro || LINEAR || V || align=right data-sort-value="0.69" | 690 m || 
|-id=439 bgcolor=#d6d6d6
| 464439 ||  || — || September 13, 1998 || Kitt Peak || Spacewatch || EOS || align=right | 1.9 km || 
|-id=440 bgcolor=#d6d6d6
| 464440 ||  || — || December 20, 2004 || Mount Lemmon || Mount Lemmon Survey || — || align=right | 4.6 km || 
|-id=441 bgcolor=#E9E9E9
| 464441 ||  || — || September 15, 2010 || Mount Lemmon || Mount Lemmon Survey || EUN || align=right | 1.0 km || 
|-id=442 bgcolor=#E9E9E9
| 464442 ||  || — || October 19, 2010 || Mount Lemmon || Mount Lemmon Survey || — || align=right | 1.3 km || 
|-id=443 bgcolor=#fefefe
| 464443 ||  || — || January 15, 2005 || Kitt Peak || Spacewatch || — || align=right data-sort-value="0.72" | 720 m || 
|-id=444 bgcolor=#d6d6d6
| 464444 ||  || — || February 10, 1999 || Socorro || LINEAR || — || align=right | 4.3 km || 
|-id=445 bgcolor=#E9E9E9
| 464445 ||  || — || February 6, 2002 || Socorro || LINEAR || — || align=right | 2.8 km || 
|-id=446 bgcolor=#d6d6d6
| 464446 ||  || — || May 10, 2005 || Mount Lemmon || Mount Lemmon Survey || — || align=right | 2.0 km || 
|-id=447 bgcolor=#d6d6d6
| 464447 ||  || — || May 2, 2000 || Anderson Mesa || LONEOS || — || align=right | 3.4 km || 
|-id=448 bgcolor=#fefefe
| 464448 ||  || — || January 1, 2012 || Mount Lemmon || Mount Lemmon Survey || — || align=right data-sort-value="0.96" | 960 m || 
|-id=449 bgcolor=#d6d6d6
| 464449 ||  || — || August 21, 2008 || Kitt Peak || Spacewatch || — || align=right | 4.0 km || 
|-id=450 bgcolor=#E9E9E9
| 464450 ||  || — || March 28, 2008 || Mount Lemmon || Mount Lemmon Survey || — || align=right data-sort-value="0.92" | 920 m || 
|-id=451 bgcolor=#d6d6d6
| 464451 ||  || — || February 25, 2011 || Mount Lemmon || Mount Lemmon Survey || — || align=right | 2.3 km || 
|-id=452 bgcolor=#d6d6d6
| 464452 ||  || — || January 10, 2011 || Mount Lemmon || Mount Lemmon Survey || — || align=right | 2.7 km || 
|-id=453 bgcolor=#E9E9E9
| 464453 ||  || — || January 4, 2011 || Mount Lemmon || Mount Lemmon Survey || — || align=right | 2.2 km || 
|-id=454 bgcolor=#E9E9E9
| 464454 ||  || — || November 17, 2009 || Mount Lemmon || Mount Lemmon Survey || — || align=right | 2.5 km || 
|-id=455 bgcolor=#d6d6d6
| 464455 ||  || — || March 12, 2011 || Mount Lemmon || Mount Lemmon Survey || EOS || align=right | 2.0 km || 
|-id=456 bgcolor=#E9E9E9
| 464456 ||  || — || August 28, 2009 || Kitt Peak || Spacewatch || critical || align=right | 1.2 km || 
|-id=457 bgcolor=#fefefe
| 464457 ||  || — || January 23, 1998 || Kitt Peak || Spacewatch || — || align=right data-sort-value="0.81" | 810 m || 
|-id=458 bgcolor=#d6d6d6
| 464458 ||  || — || October 1, 2003 || Kitt Peak || Spacewatch || — || align=right | 3.6 km || 
|-id=459 bgcolor=#E9E9E9
| 464459 ||  || — || February 17, 2007 || Kitt Peak || Spacewatch || — || align=right | 2.1 km || 
|-id=460 bgcolor=#d6d6d6
| 464460 ||  || — || December 19, 2004 || Mount Lemmon || Mount Lemmon Survey || THM || align=right | 2.1 km || 
|-id=461 bgcolor=#d6d6d6
| 464461 ||  || — || January 17, 2005 || Kitt Peak || Spacewatch || — || align=right | 3.7 km || 
|-id=462 bgcolor=#d6d6d6
| 464462 ||  || — || November 25, 2005 || Catalina || CSS || — || align=right | 2.3 km || 
|-id=463 bgcolor=#d6d6d6
| 464463 ||  || — || January 16, 2005 || Kitt Peak || Spacewatch || EOS || align=right | 2.1 km || 
|-id=464 bgcolor=#fefefe
| 464464 ||  || — || October 9, 2004 || Kitt Peak || Spacewatch || — || align=right data-sort-value="0.53" | 530 m || 
|-id=465 bgcolor=#d6d6d6
| 464465 ||  || — || December 25, 2005 || Mount Lemmon || Mount Lemmon Survey || KOR || align=right | 1.2 km || 
|-id=466 bgcolor=#fefefe
| 464466 ||  || — || December 15, 2004 || Kitt Peak || Spacewatch || — || align=right data-sort-value="0.82" | 820 m || 
|-id=467 bgcolor=#d6d6d6
| 464467 ||  || — || November 9, 2009 || Kitt Peak || Spacewatch || — || align=right | 2.6 km || 
|-id=468 bgcolor=#d6d6d6
| 464468 ||  || — || September 21, 2009 || Mount Lemmon || Mount Lemmon Survey || KOR || align=right | 1.3 km || 
|-id=469 bgcolor=#d6d6d6
| 464469 ||  || — || September 30, 2003 || Kitt Peak || Spacewatch || EOS || align=right | 2.4 km || 
|-id=470 bgcolor=#fefefe
| 464470 ||  || — || April 12, 2005 || Kitt Peak || Spacewatch || MAS || align=right data-sort-value="0.58" | 580 m || 
|-id=471 bgcolor=#d6d6d6
| 464471 ||  || — || December 14, 2010 || Mount Lemmon || Mount Lemmon Survey || — || align=right | 2.9 km || 
|-id=472 bgcolor=#d6d6d6
| 464472 ||  || — || September 2, 2008 || Kitt Peak || Spacewatch || — || align=right | 2.9 km || 
|-id=473 bgcolor=#E9E9E9
| 464473 ||  || — || September 25, 2005 || Kitt Peak || Spacewatch || — || align=right | 2.0 km || 
|-id=474 bgcolor=#fefefe
| 464474 ||  || — || September 10, 2007 || Mount Lemmon || Mount Lemmon Survey || — || align=right data-sort-value="0.64" | 640 m || 
|-id=475 bgcolor=#E9E9E9
| 464475 ||  || — || January 28, 2007 || Mount Lemmon || Mount Lemmon Survey || AGN || align=right | 1.1 km || 
|-id=476 bgcolor=#d6d6d6
| 464476 ||  || — || February 10, 2010 || WISE || WISE || — || align=right | 3.6 km || 
|-id=477 bgcolor=#fefefe
| 464477 ||  || — || January 31, 2009 || Kitt Peak || Spacewatch || — || align=right data-sort-value="0.52" | 520 m || 
|-id=478 bgcolor=#d6d6d6
| 464478 ||  || — || February 2, 2005 || Kitt Peak || Spacewatch || — || align=right | 3.2 km || 
|-id=479 bgcolor=#d6d6d6
| 464479 ||  || — || March 5, 2006 || Kitt Peak || Spacewatch || — || align=right | 2.6 km || 
|-id=480 bgcolor=#E9E9E9
| 464480 ||  || — || July 20, 2010 || WISE || WISE || — || align=right | 2.3 km || 
|-id=481 bgcolor=#E9E9E9
| 464481 ||  || — || March 10, 1999 || Kitt Peak || Spacewatch || — || align=right | 1.6 km || 
|-id=482 bgcolor=#fefefe
| 464482 ||  || — || January 16, 2005 || Kitt Peak || Spacewatch || — || align=right data-sort-value="0.76" | 760 m || 
|-id=483 bgcolor=#d6d6d6
| 464483 ||  || — || March 11, 2005 || Anderson Mesa || LONEOS || — || align=right | 5.1 km || 
|-id=484 bgcolor=#E9E9E9
| 464484 ||  || — || October 30, 2005 || Mount Lemmon || Mount Lemmon Survey || — || align=right | 2.3 km || 
|-id=485 bgcolor=#d6d6d6
| 464485 ||  || — || November 8, 2009 || Catalina || CSS || — || align=right | 3.6 km || 
|-id=486 bgcolor=#E9E9E9
| 464486 ||  || — || January 26, 2007 || Kitt Peak || Spacewatch || GEF || align=right | 1.4 km || 
|-id=487 bgcolor=#E9E9E9
| 464487 ||  || — || March 10, 2007 || Mount Lemmon || Mount Lemmon Survey || — || align=right | 2.0 km || 
|-id=488 bgcolor=#d6d6d6
| 464488 ||  || — || February 25, 2011 || Kitt Peak || Spacewatch || — || align=right | 2.7 km || 
|-id=489 bgcolor=#fefefe
| 464489 ||  || — || March 8, 2005 || Mount Lemmon || Mount Lemmon Survey || — || align=right data-sort-value="0.77" | 770 m || 
|-id=490 bgcolor=#E9E9E9
| 464490 ||  || — || January 10, 2007 || Catalina || CSS || — || align=right | 1.7 km || 
|-id=491 bgcolor=#E9E9E9
| 464491 ||  || — || November 15, 2006 || Mount Lemmon || Mount Lemmon Survey || — || align=right | 1.2 km || 
|-id=492 bgcolor=#fefefe
| 464492 ||  || — || January 4, 2006 || Mount Lemmon || Mount Lemmon Survey || — || align=right data-sort-value="0.70" | 700 m || 
|-id=493 bgcolor=#d6d6d6
| 464493 ||  || — || February 8, 2010 || WISE || WISE || — || align=right | 2.4 km || 
|-id=494 bgcolor=#fefefe
| 464494 ||  || — || February 25, 2006 || Kitt Peak || Spacewatch || — || align=right data-sort-value="0.86" | 860 m || 
|-id=495 bgcolor=#E9E9E9
| 464495 ||  || — || March 25, 2012 || Mount Lemmon || Mount Lemmon Survey || HOF || align=right | 2.5 km || 
|-id=496 bgcolor=#fefefe
| 464496 ||  || — || February 4, 2005 || Mount Lemmon || Mount Lemmon Survey || V || align=right data-sort-value="0.62" | 620 m || 
|-id=497 bgcolor=#E9E9E9
| 464497 ||  || — || April 28, 2008 || Mount Lemmon || Mount Lemmon Survey || — || align=right | 1.6 km || 
|-id=498 bgcolor=#d6d6d6
| 464498 ||  || — || March 1, 2005 || Kitt Peak || Spacewatch || — || align=right | 3.7 km || 
|-id=499 bgcolor=#fefefe
| 464499 ||  || — || May 3, 2010 || Kitt Peak || Spacewatch || — || align=right data-sort-value="0.62" | 620 m || 
|-id=500 bgcolor=#d6d6d6
| 464500 ||  || — || January 14, 2010 || Kitt Peak || Spacewatch || — || align=right | 5.0 km || 
|}

464501–464600 

|-bgcolor=#d6d6d6
| 464501 ||  || — || February 1, 2005 || Catalina || CSS || — || align=right | 3.4 km || 
|-id=502 bgcolor=#fefefe
| 464502 ||  || — || October 23, 2008 || Kitt Peak || Spacewatch || — || align=right data-sort-value="0.58" | 580 m || 
|-id=503 bgcolor=#fefefe
| 464503 ||  || — || October 18, 2007 || Kitt Peak || Spacewatch || — || align=right data-sort-value="0.57" | 570 m || 
|-id=504 bgcolor=#E9E9E9
| 464504 ||  || — || March 19, 2007 || Mount Lemmon || Mount Lemmon Survey || — || align=right | 2.3 km || 
|-id=505 bgcolor=#E9E9E9
| 464505 ||  || — || November 1, 2005 || Mount Lemmon || Mount Lemmon Survey || — || align=right | 1.8 km || 
|-id=506 bgcolor=#E9E9E9
| 464506 ||  || — || September 19, 2009 || Mount Lemmon || Mount Lemmon Survey || — || align=right | 2.0 km || 
|-id=507 bgcolor=#d6d6d6
| 464507 ||  || — || October 10, 2002 || Apache Point || SDSS || — || align=right | 2.5 km || 
|-id=508 bgcolor=#FA8072
| 464508 ||  || — || February 10, 2002 || Socorro || LINEAR || — || align=right | 1.1 km || 
|-id=509 bgcolor=#E9E9E9
| 464509 ||  || — || December 5, 2010 || Kitt Peak || Spacewatch || HOF || align=right | 3.1 km || 
|-id=510 bgcolor=#d6d6d6
| 464510 ||  || — || August 24, 2008 || Kitt Peak || Spacewatch || — || align=right | 2.7 km || 
|-id=511 bgcolor=#fefefe
| 464511 ||  || — || April 21, 2009 || Kitt Peak || Spacewatch || V || align=right data-sort-value="0.60" | 600 m || 
|-id=512 bgcolor=#d6d6d6
| 464512 ||  || — || March 14, 2011 || Mount Lemmon || Mount Lemmon Survey || — || align=right | 2.2 km || 
|-id=513 bgcolor=#d6d6d6
| 464513 ||  || — || April 18, 2007 || Kitt Peak || Spacewatch || — || align=right | 2.0 km || 
|-id=514 bgcolor=#d6d6d6
| 464514 ||  || — || March 1, 2005 || Kitt Peak || Spacewatch || — || align=right | 2.2 km || 
|-id=515 bgcolor=#fefefe
| 464515 ||  || — || May 22, 2006 || Kitt Peak || Spacewatch || — || align=right data-sort-value="0.66" | 660 m || 
|-id=516 bgcolor=#d6d6d6
| 464516 ||  || — || December 30, 2005 || Kitt Peak || Spacewatch || — || align=right | 2.7 km || 
|-id=517 bgcolor=#d6d6d6
| 464517 ||  || — || December 27, 2005 || Kitt Peak || Spacewatch || — || align=right | 2.8 km || 
|-id=518 bgcolor=#fefefe
| 464518 ||  || — || September 21, 2003 || Kitt Peak || Spacewatch || V || align=right data-sort-value="0.81" | 810 m || 
|-id=519 bgcolor=#fefefe
| 464519 ||  || — || October 5, 2004 || Anderson Mesa || LONEOS || — || align=right data-sort-value="0.89" | 890 m || 
|-id=520 bgcolor=#E9E9E9
| 464520 ||  || — || October 24, 1995 || Kitt Peak || Spacewatch || AGN || align=right | 1.5 km || 
|-id=521 bgcolor=#E9E9E9
| 464521 ||  || — || November 13, 2010 || Kitt Peak || Spacewatch ||  || align=right | 1.5 km || 
|-id=522 bgcolor=#fefefe
| 464522 ||  || — || November 26, 2005 || Mount Lemmon || Mount Lemmon Survey || — || align=right data-sort-value="0.43" | 430 m || 
|-id=523 bgcolor=#fefefe
| 464523 ||  || — || March 13, 2005 || Kitt Peak || Spacewatch || NYS || align=right data-sort-value="0.69" | 690 m || 
|-id=524 bgcolor=#d6d6d6
| 464524 ||  || — || March 6, 2010 || WISE || WISE || — || align=right | 2.5 km || 
|-id=525 bgcolor=#fefefe
| 464525 ||  || — || April 19, 2009 || Kitt Peak || Spacewatch || — || align=right data-sort-value="0.89" | 890 m || 
|-id=526 bgcolor=#E9E9E9
| 464526 ||  || — || September 23, 2001 || Kitt Peak || Spacewatch || — || align=right | 1.5 km || 
|-id=527 bgcolor=#d6d6d6
| 464527 ||  || — || January 8, 2000 || Kitt Peak || Spacewatch || — || align=right | 2.3 km || 
|-id=528 bgcolor=#d6d6d6
| 464528 ||  || — || January 17, 2005 || Kitt Peak || Spacewatch || — || align=right | 2.8 km || 
|-id=529 bgcolor=#E9E9E9
| 464529 ||  || — || January 27, 2007 || Kitt Peak || Spacewatch || — || align=right | 1.6 km || 
|-id=530 bgcolor=#fefefe
| 464530 ||  || — || April 7, 2005 || Kitt Peak || Spacewatch || — || align=right data-sort-value="0.89" | 890 m || 
|-id=531 bgcolor=#E9E9E9
| 464531 ||  || — || November 4, 2005 || Mount Lemmon || Mount Lemmon Survey || HOF || align=right | 2.5 km || 
|-id=532 bgcolor=#E9E9E9
| 464532 ||  || — || November 2, 2010 || Mount Lemmon || Mount Lemmon Survey || — || align=right | 2.0 km || 
|-id=533 bgcolor=#d6d6d6
| 464533 ||  || — || March 21, 1999 || Apache Point || SDSS || — || align=right | 3.4 km || 
|-id=534 bgcolor=#d6d6d6
| 464534 ||  || — || February 7, 2010 || WISE || WISE || — || align=right | 2.6 km || 
|-id=535 bgcolor=#E9E9E9
| 464535 ||  || — || October 28, 2005 || Mount Lemmon || Mount Lemmon Survey || HOF || align=right | 2.8 km || 
|-id=536 bgcolor=#fefefe
| 464536 ||  || — || January 17, 2005 || Kitt Peak || Spacewatch || — || align=right data-sort-value="0.95" | 950 m || 
|-id=537 bgcolor=#d6d6d6
| 464537 ||  || — || March 16, 2005 || Catalina || CSS || THB || align=right | 3.1 km || 
|-id=538 bgcolor=#fefefe
| 464538 ||  || — || March 2, 2005 || Kitt Peak || Spacewatch || — || align=right data-sort-value="0.95" | 950 m || 
|-id=539 bgcolor=#d6d6d6
| 464539 ||  || — || May 11, 2007 || Mount Lemmon || Mount Lemmon Survey || EOS || align=right | 2.2 km || 
|-id=540 bgcolor=#E9E9E9
| 464540 ||  || — || February 10, 2007 || Catalina || CSS || — || align=right | 2.5 km || 
|-id=541 bgcolor=#d6d6d6
| 464541 ||  || — || September 16, 2003 || Kitt Peak || Spacewatch || EMA || align=right | 2.6 km || 
|-id=542 bgcolor=#fefefe
| 464542 ||  || — || October 24, 2011 || Mount Lemmon || Mount Lemmon Survey || — || align=right data-sort-value="0.62" | 620 m || 
|-id=543 bgcolor=#d6d6d6
| 464543 ||  || — || April 5, 2010 || WISE || WISE || — || align=right | 3.2 km || 
|-id=544 bgcolor=#fefefe
| 464544 ||  || — || September 18, 2003 || Kitt Peak || Spacewatch || — || align=right data-sort-value="0.97" | 970 m || 
|-id=545 bgcolor=#E9E9E9
| 464545 ||  || — || February 13, 2004 || Kitt Peak || Spacewatch || — || align=right data-sort-value="0.71" | 710 m || 
|-id=546 bgcolor=#E9E9E9
| 464546 ||  || — || October 25, 2005 || Mount Lemmon || Mount Lemmon Survey || AST || align=right | 1.9 km || 
|-id=547 bgcolor=#E9E9E9
| 464547 ||  || — || January 17, 2007 || Kitt Peak || Spacewatch || — || align=right | 1.5 km || 
|-id=548 bgcolor=#d6d6d6
| 464548 ||  || — || September 22, 2003 || Kitt Peak || Spacewatch || — || align=right | 3.0 km || 
|-id=549 bgcolor=#fefefe
| 464549 ||  || — || January 22, 2006 || Mount Lemmon || Mount Lemmon Survey || — || align=right data-sort-value="0.72" | 720 m || 
|-id=550 bgcolor=#fefefe
| 464550 ||  || — || September 9, 2007 || Kitt Peak || Spacewatch || — || align=right data-sort-value="0.78" | 780 m || 
|-id=551 bgcolor=#E9E9E9
| 464551 ||  || — || December 27, 2006 || Kitt Peak || Spacewatch || — || align=right | 1.6 km || 
|-id=552 bgcolor=#E9E9E9
| 464552 ||  || — || October 23, 2006 || Mount Lemmon || Mount Lemmon Survey || — || align=right | 1.3 km || 
|-id=553 bgcolor=#E9E9E9
| 464553 ||  || — || May 30, 2013 || Kitt Peak || Spacewatch || — || align=right | 2.7 km || 
|-id=554 bgcolor=#E9E9E9
| 464554 ||  || — || October 3, 2006 || Mount Lemmon || Mount Lemmon Survey || (5) || align=right data-sort-value="0.77" | 770 m || 
|-id=555 bgcolor=#E9E9E9
| 464555 ||  || — || October 17, 2009 || Kitt Peak || Spacewatch || — || align=right | 1.9 km || 
|-id=556 bgcolor=#d6d6d6
| 464556 ||  || — || March 17, 2010 || WISE || WISE || — || align=right | 3.5 km || 
|-id=557 bgcolor=#E9E9E9
| 464557 ||  || — || November 4, 1996 || Kitt Peak || Spacewatch || — || align=right | 2.1 km || 
|-id=558 bgcolor=#fefefe
| 464558 ||  || — || October 16, 2007 || Catalina || CSS || — || align=right data-sort-value="0.95" | 950 m || 
|-id=559 bgcolor=#fefefe
| 464559 ||  || — || January 31, 2009 || Mount Lemmon || Mount Lemmon Survey || — || align=right data-sort-value="0.88" | 880 m || 
|-id=560 bgcolor=#E9E9E9
| 464560 ||  || — || March 28, 2008 || Mount Lemmon || Mount Lemmon Survey || — || align=right | 1.5 km || 
|-id=561 bgcolor=#fefefe
| 464561 ||  || — || December 18, 2004 || Mount Lemmon || Mount Lemmon Survey || V || align=right data-sort-value="0.65" | 650 m || 
|-id=562 bgcolor=#E9E9E9
| 464562 ||  || — || September 27, 2006 || Kitt Peak || Spacewatch || — || align=right data-sort-value="0.81" | 810 m || 
|-id=563 bgcolor=#d6d6d6
| 464563 ||  || — || March 15, 2007 || Kitt Peak || Spacewatch || — || align=right | 2.4 km || 
|-id=564 bgcolor=#d6d6d6
| 464564 ||  || — || March 8, 2010 || WISE || WISE || — || align=right | 2.6 km || 
|-id=565 bgcolor=#d6d6d6
| 464565 ||  || — || November 21, 2008 || Kitt Peak || Spacewatch || HYG || align=right | 3.3 km || 
|-id=566 bgcolor=#d6d6d6
| 464566 ||  || — || January 19, 2005 || Kitt Peak || Spacewatch || — || align=right | 2.9 km || 
|-id=567 bgcolor=#fefefe
| 464567 ||  || — || March 31, 2003 || Kitt Peak || Spacewatch || — || align=right data-sort-value="0.75" | 750 m || 
|-id=568 bgcolor=#d6d6d6
| 464568 ||  || — || October 27, 2008 || Mount Lemmon || Mount Lemmon Survey || — || align=right | 4.0 km || 
|-id=569 bgcolor=#d6d6d6
| 464569 ||  || — || March 13, 2011 || Mount Lemmon || Mount Lemmon Survey || — || align=right | 3.0 km || 
|-id=570 bgcolor=#E9E9E9
| 464570 ||  || — || November 12, 2001 || Apache Point || SDSS || — || align=right | 1.6 km || 
|-id=571 bgcolor=#d6d6d6
| 464571 ||  || — || October 18, 2003 || Kitt Peak || Spacewatch || — || align=right | 2.9 km || 
|-id=572 bgcolor=#E9E9E9
| 464572 ||  || — || October 27, 2005 || Kitt Peak || Spacewatch || DOR || align=right | 2.5 km || 
|-id=573 bgcolor=#d6d6d6
| 464573 ||  || — || March 16, 2007 || Kitt Peak || Spacewatch || — || align=right | 2.7 km || 
|-id=574 bgcolor=#E9E9E9
| 464574 ||  || — || December 3, 1996 || Kitt Peak || Spacewatch || — || align=right | 3.6 km || 
|-id=575 bgcolor=#d6d6d6
| 464575 ||  || — || October 5, 2002 || Apache Point || SDSS || — || align=right | 4.2 km || 
|-id=576 bgcolor=#E9E9E9
| 464576 ||  || — || November 22, 2006 || Mount Lemmon || Mount Lemmon Survey || — || align=right | 1.6 km || 
|-id=577 bgcolor=#fefefe
| 464577 ||  || — || November 25, 2005 || Mount Lemmon || Mount Lemmon Survey || — || align=right data-sort-value="0.49" | 490 m || 
|-id=578 bgcolor=#d6d6d6
| 464578 ||  || — || April 3, 2010 || WISE || WISE || — || align=right | 3.5 km || 
|-id=579 bgcolor=#d6d6d6
| 464579 ||  || — || October 17, 2003 || Kitt Peak || Spacewatch || — || align=right | 3.1 km || 
|-id=580 bgcolor=#d6d6d6
| 464580 ||  || — || October 13, 2014 || Mount Lemmon || Mount Lemmon Survey || — || align=right | 2.6 km || 
|-id=581 bgcolor=#d6d6d6
| 464581 ||  || — || February 20, 2006 || Kitt Peak || Spacewatch || EOS || align=right | 1.9 km || 
|-id=582 bgcolor=#d6d6d6
| 464582 ||  || — || October 21, 2003 || Palomar || NEAT || EOS || align=right | 2.1 km || 
|-id=583 bgcolor=#d6d6d6
| 464583 ||  || — || November 18, 2003 || Kitt Peak || Spacewatch || EOS || align=right | 2.1 km || 
|-id=584 bgcolor=#d6d6d6
| 464584 ||  || — || February 6, 2011 || Catalina || CSS || — || align=right | 3.9 km || 
|-id=585 bgcolor=#fefefe
| 464585 ||  || — || April 7, 2006 || Mount Lemmon || Mount Lemmon Survey || — || align=right data-sort-value="0.49" | 490 m || 
|-id=586 bgcolor=#E9E9E9
| 464586 ||  || — || July 5, 2000 || Kitt Peak || Spacewatch || — || align=right | 2.1 km || 
|-id=587 bgcolor=#d6d6d6
| 464587 ||  || — || September 12, 2002 || Palomar || NEAT || — || align=right | 3.3 km || 
|-id=588 bgcolor=#fefefe
| 464588 ||  || — || June 8, 1999 || Kitt Peak || Spacewatch || — || align=right | 1.0 km || 
|-id=589 bgcolor=#E9E9E9
| 464589 ||  || — || October 7, 2005 || Mount Lemmon || Mount Lemmon Survey || — || align=right | 2.0 km || 
|-id=590 bgcolor=#E9E9E9
| 464590 ||  || — || November 18, 2006 || Mount Lemmon || Mount Lemmon Survey || — || align=right data-sort-value="0.86" | 860 m || 
|-id=591 bgcolor=#E9E9E9
| 464591 ||  || — || November 10, 2010 || Mount Lemmon || Mount Lemmon Survey || — || align=right | 1.6 km || 
|-id=592 bgcolor=#E9E9E9
| 464592 ||  || — || March 12, 2008 || Kitt Peak || Spacewatch || — || align=right | 1.3 km || 
|-id=593 bgcolor=#d6d6d6
| 464593 ||  || — || January 12, 2010 || Mount Lemmon || Mount Lemmon Survey || — || align=right | 3.3 km || 
|-id=594 bgcolor=#E9E9E9
| 464594 ||  || — || June 16, 2009 || Mount Lemmon || Mount Lemmon Survey || — || align=right | 1.9 km || 
|-id=595 bgcolor=#d6d6d6
| 464595 ||  || — || October 8, 2008 || Mount Lemmon || Mount Lemmon Survey || — || align=right | 2.8 km || 
|-id=596 bgcolor=#d6d6d6
| 464596 ||  || — || November 3, 2004 || Kitt Peak || Spacewatch || — || align=right | 2.1 km || 
|-id=597 bgcolor=#d6d6d6
| 464597 ||  || — || March 17, 2010 || WISE || WISE || — || align=right | 2.7 km || 
|-id=598 bgcolor=#d6d6d6
| 464598 ||  || — || February 24, 2006 || Kitt Peak || Spacewatch || — || align=right | 2.5 km || 
|-id=599 bgcolor=#E9E9E9
| 464599 ||  || — || November 21, 2005 || Kitt Peak || Spacewatch || — || align=right | 2.4 km || 
|-id=600 bgcolor=#fefefe
| 464600 ||  || — || December 29, 2008 || Kitt Peak || Spacewatch || — || align=right data-sort-value="0.65" | 650 m || 
|}

464601–464700 

|-bgcolor=#fefefe
| 464601 ||  || — || April 26, 2006 || Kitt Peak || Spacewatch || — || align=right data-sort-value="0.75" | 750 m || 
|-id=602 bgcolor=#d6d6d6
| 464602 ||  || — || November 19, 2009 || Kitt Peak || Spacewatch || — || align=right | 2.3 km || 
|-id=603 bgcolor=#d6d6d6
| 464603 ||  || — || September 11, 2007 || Kitt Peak || Spacewatch || — || align=right | 3.0 km || 
|-id=604 bgcolor=#d6d6d6
| 464604 ||  || — || October 22, 2003 || Kitt Peak || Spacewatch || — || align=right | 2.2 km || 
|-id=605 bgcolor=#d6d6d6
| 464605 ||  || — || January 29, 2011 || Mount Lemmon || Mount Lemmon Survey || — || align=right | 1.9 km || 
|-id=606 bgcolor=#fefefe
| 464606 ||  || — || November 17, 2001 || Haleakala || NEAT || H || align=right data-sort-value="0.70" | 700 m || 
|-id=607 bgcolor=#d6d6d6
| 464607 ||  || — || March 10, 2005 || Anderson Mesa || LONEOS || — || align=right | 2.9 km || 
|-id=608 bgcolor=#E9E9E9
| 464608 ||  || — || February 23, 2012 || Mount Lemmon || Mount Lemmon Survey || — || align=right | 1.5 km || 
|-id=609 bgcolor=#E9E9E9
| 464609 ||  || — || August 28, 2006 || Kitt Peak || Spacewatch || — || align=right data-sort-value="0.96" | 960 m || 
|-id=610 bgcolor=#FA8072
| 464610 ||  || — || January 31, 2006 || Kitt Peak || Spacewatch || H || align=right data-sort-value="0.54" | 540 m || 
|-id=611 bgcolor=#fefefe
| 464611 ||  || — || February 5, 2009 || Catalina || CSS || — || align=right data-sort-value="0.80" | 800 m || 
|-id=612 bgcolor=#d6d6d6
| 464612 ||  || — || April 14, 2007 || Mount Lemmon || Mount Lemmon Survey || — || align=right | 2.4 km || 
|-id=613 bgcolor=#d6d6d6
| 464613 ||  || — || March 5, 2010 || WISE || WISE || EOS || align=right | 1.9 km || 
|-id=614 bgcolor=#fefefe
| 464614 ||  || — || September 26, 2006 || Kitt Peak || Spacewatch || — || align=right | 1.1 km || 
|-id=615 bgcolor=#d6d6d6
| 464615 ||  || — || January 11, 2011 || Mount Lemmon || Mount Lemmon Survey || — || align=right | 2.2 km || 
|-id=616 bgcolor=#d6d6d6
| 464616 ||  || — || March 9, 2010 || WISE || WISE || HYG || align=right | 2.5 km || 
|-id=617 bgcolor=#d6d6d6
| 464617 ||  || — || December 21, 2003 || Kitt Peak || Spacewatch || — || align=right | 4.4 km || 
|-id=618 bgcolor=#E9E9E9
| 464618 ||  || — || November 6, 2005 || Kitt Peak || Spacewatch || — || align=right | 2.1 km || 
|-id=619 bgcolor=#E9E9E9
| 464619 ||  || — || October 8, 2002 || Anderson Mesa || LONEOS || — || align=right | 2.8 km || 
|-id=620 bgcolor=#d6d6d6
| 464620 ||  || — || November 18, 2003 || Kitt Peak || Spacewatch || — || align=right | 2.9 km || 
|-id=621 bgcolor=#d6d6d6
| 464621 ||  || — || December 20, 2009 || Mount Lemmon || Mount Lemmon Survey || — || align=right | 2.0 km || 
|-id=622 bgcolor=#d6d6d6
| 464622 ||  || — || October 27, 2008 || Mount Lemmon || Mount Lemmon Survey || — || align=right | 3.1 km || 
|-id=623 bgcolor=#d6d6d6
| 464623 ||  || — || September 25, 1995 || Kitt Peak || Spacewatch || TIR || align=right | 2.3 km || 
|-id=624 bgcolor=#d6d6d6
| 464624 ||  || — || September 28, 1997 || Kitt Peak || Spacewatch || EOS || align=right | 1.6 km || 
|-id=625 bgcolor=#fefefe
| 464625 ||  || — || October 2, 1997 || Kitt Peak || Spacewatch || — || align=right data-sort-value="0.62" | 620 m || 
|-id=626 bgcolor=#d6d6d6
| 464626 ||  || — || September 19, 1998 || Apache Point || SDSS || EOS || align=right | 1.6 km || 
|-id=627 bgcolor=#E9E9E9
| 464627 ||  || — || October 19, 1998 || Kitt Peak || Spacewatch || — || align=right data-sort-value="0.71" | 710 m || 
|-id=628 bgcolor=#E9E9E9
| 464628 ||  || — || February 9, 1999 || Kitt Peak || Spacewatch || — || align=right | 1.4 km || 
|-id=629 bgcolor=#E9E9E9
| 464629 ||  || — || February 11, 1999 || Kitt Peak || Spacewatch || — || align=right | 1.2 km || 
|-id=630 bgcolor=#d6d6d6
| 464630 ||  || — || March 13, 1999 || Kitt Peak || Spacewatch || — || align=right | 3.6 km || 
|-id=631 bgcolor=#fefefe
| 464631 ||  || — || September 7, 1999 || Kitt Peak || Spacewatch || — || align=right data-sort-value="0.72" | 720 m || 
|-id=632 bgcolor=#E9E9E9
| 464632 ||  || — || October 3, 1999 || Kitt Peak || Spacewatch || — || align=right | 2.3 km || 
|-id=633 bgcolor=#FA8072
| 464633 ||  || — || October 3, 1999 || Kitt Peak || Spacewatch || — || align=right data-sort-value="0.77" | 770 m || 
|-id=634 bgcolor=#E9E9E9
| 464634 ||  || — || October 5, 1999 || Kitt Peak || Spacewatch || — || align=right | 1.8 km || 
|-id=635 bgcolor=#E9E9E9
| 464635 ||  || — || October 15, 1999 || Kitt Peak || Spacewatch || — || align=right | 2.3 km || 
|-id=636 bgcolor=#fefefe
| 464636 ||  || — || October 2, 1999 || Kitt Peak || Spacewatch || NYS || align=right data-sort-value="0.69" | 690 m || 
|-id=637 bgcolor=#fefefe
| 464637 ||  || — || October 2, 1999 || Catalina || CSS || — || align=right data-sort-value="0.98" | 980 m || 
|-id=638 bgcolor=#d6d6d6
| 464638 ||  || — || January 27, 2000 || Kitt Peak || Spacewatch || — || align=right | 2.8 km || 
|-id=639 bgcolor=#FFC2E0
| 464639 ||  || — || August 2, 2000 || Mauna Kea || M. Connors, C. Veillet || AMO || align=right data-sort-value="0.56" | 560 m || 
|-id=640 bgcolor=#fefefe
| 464640 ||  || — || August 25, 2000 || Socorro || LINEAR || — || align=right data-sort-value="0.82" | 820 m || 
|-id=641 bgcolor=#fefefe
| 464641 ||  || — || August 31, 2000 || Socorro || LINEAR || — || align=right data-sort-value="0.77" | 770 m || 
|-id=642 bgcolor=#E9E9E9
| 464642 ||  || — || August 1, 2000 || Socorro || LINEAR || (1547) || align=right | 2.0 km || 
|-id=643 bgcolor=#E9E9E9
| 464643 ||  || — || August 31, 2000 || Socorro || LINEAR || — || align=right | 1.8 km || 
|-id=644 bgcolor=#FA8072
| 464644 ||  || — || September 1, 2000 || Socorro || LINEAR || — || align=right | 1.1 km || 
|-id=645 bgcolor=#fefefe
| 464645 ||  || — || September 23, 2000 || Socorro || LINEAR || — || align=right data-sort-value="0.89" | 890 m || 
|-id=646 bgcolor=#E9E9E9
| 464646 ||  || — || September 24, 2000 || Socorro || LINEAR || critical || align=right | 1.5 km || 
|-id=647 bgcolor=#fefefe
| 464647 ||  || — || September 26, 2000 || Anderson Mesa || LONEOS || — || align=right data-sort-value="0.80" | 800 m || 
|-id=648 bgcolor=#E9E9E9
| 464648 ||  || — || October 5, 2000 || Haleakala || NEAT || — || align=right | 1.9 km || 
|-id=649 bgcolor=#E9E9E9
| 464649 ||  || — || October 19, 2000 || Kitt Peak || Spacewatch || — || align=right | 1.8 km || 
|-id=650 bgcolor=#E9E9E9
| 464650 ||  || — || November 3, 2000 || Socorro || LINEAR || — || align=right | 3.3 km || 
|-id=651 bgcolor=#fefefe
| 464651 ||  || — || November 29, 2000 || Socorro || LINEAR || — || align=right | 1.2 km || 
|-id=652 bgcolor=#FA8072
| 464652 ||  || — || April 15, 2001 || Kitt Peak || Spacewatch || — || align=right data-sort-value="0.79" | 790 m || 
|-id=653 bgcolor=#fefefe
| 464653 ||  || — || May 17, 2001 || Kitt Peak || Spacewatch || H || align=right data-sort-value="0.78" | 780 m || 
|-id=654 bgcolor=#E9E9E9
| 464654 ||  || — || July 12, 2001 || Palomar || NEAT || — || align=right | 1.4 km || 
|-id=655 bgcolor=#FA8072
| 464655 ||  || — || August 17, 2001 || Socorro || LINEAR || — || align=right data-sort-value="0.65" | 650 m || 
|-id=656 bgcolor=#d6d6d6
| 464656 ||  || — || August 27, 2001 || Kitt Peak || Spacewatch || — || align=right | 3.0 km || 
|-id=657 bgcolor=#d6d6d6
| 464657 ||  || — || September 12, 2001 || Socorro || LINEAR || — || align=right | 2.1 km || 
|-id=658 bgcolor=#fefefe
| 464658 ||  || — || September 12, 2001 || Socorro || LINEAR || — || align=right data-sort-value="0.64" | 640 m || 
|-id=659 bgcolor=#d6d6d6
| 464659 ||  || — || September 19, 2001 || Socorro || LINEAR || THB || align=right | 3.1 km || 
|-id=660 bgcolor=#fefefe
| 464660 ||  || — || September 16, 2001 || Socorro || LINEAR || H || align=right data-sort-value="0.54" | 540 m || 
|-id=661 bgcolor=#fefefe
| 464661 ||  || — || September 20, 2001 || Socorro || LINEAR || — || align=right data-sort-value="0.74" | 740 m || 
|-id=662 bgcolor=#E9E9E9
| 464662 ||  || — || September 24, 1960 || Palomar || PLS || — || align=right | 1.2 km || 
|-id=663 bgcolor=#d6d6d6
| 464663 ||  || — || September 16, 2001 || Socorro || LINEAR || — || align=right | 3.3 km || 
|-id=664 bgcolor=#E9E9E9
| 464664 ||  || — || September 19, 2001 || Socorro || LINEAR || — || align=right | 1.1 km || 
|-id=665 bgcolor=#d6d6d6
| 464665 ||  || — || September 19, 2001 || Socorro || LINEAR || — || align=right | 3.6 km || 
|-id=666 bgcolor=#E9E9E9
| 464666 ||  || — || September 19, 2001 || Socorro || LINEAR || — || align=right | 1.2 km || 
|-id=667 bgcolor=#E9E9E9
| 464667 ||  || — || September 22, 2001 || Kitt Peak || Spacewatch || — || align=right data-sort-value="0.69" | 690 m || 
|-id=668 bgcolor=#d6d6d6
| 464668 ||  || — || September 20, 2001 || Socorro || LINEAR || — || align=right | 2.9 km || 
|-id=669 bgcolor=#E9E9E9
| 464669 ||  || — || September 22, 2001 || Socorro || LINEAR || — || align=right data-sort-value="0.94" | 940 m || 
|-id=670 bgcolor=#d6d6d6
| 464670 ||  || — || September 21, 2001 || Socorro || LINEAR || — || align=right | 2.4 km || 
|-id=671 bgcolor=#E9E9E9
| 464671 ||  || — || September 17, 2001 || Kitt Peak || Spacewatch || — || align=right data-sort-value="0.76" | 760 m || 
|-id=672 bgcolor=#fefefe
| 464672 ||  || — || October 13, 2001 || Socorro || LINEAR || H || align=right data-sort-value="0.51" | 510 m || 
|-id=673 bgcolor=#fefefe
| 464673 ||  || — || September 20, 2001 || Socorro || LINEAR || — || align=right data-sort-value="0.64" | 640 m || 
|-id=674 bgcolor=#E9E9E9
| 464674 ||  || — || October 14, 2001 || Socorro || LINEAR || — || align=right data-sort-value="0.94" | 940 m || 
|-id=675 bgcolor=#fefefe
| 464675 ||  || — || October 14, 2001 || Socorro || LINEAR || — || align=right data-sort-value="0.60" | 600 m || 
|-id=676 bgcolor=#E9E9E9
| 464676 ||  || — || October 14, 2001 || Socorro || LINEAR || — || align=right | 1.7 km || 
|-id=677 bgcolor=#E9E9E9
| 464677 ||  || — || October 13, 2001 || Kitt Peak || Spacewatch || — || align=right | 1.1 km || 
|-id=678 bgcolor=#E9E9E9
| 464678 ||  || — || October 11, 2001 || Socorro || LINEAR || — || align=right | 1.4 km || 
|-id=679 bgcolor=#fefefe
| 464679 ||  || — || October 23, 2001 || Kitt Peak || Spacewatch || H || align=right data-sort-value="0.57" | 570 m || 
|-id=680 bgcolor=#E9E9E9
| 464680 ||  || — || October 13, 2001 || Anderson Mesa || LONEOS || — || align=right | 1.5 km || 
|-id=681 bgcolor=#E9E9E9
| 464681 ||  || — || October 17, 2001 || Socorro || LINEAR || — || align=right data-sort-value="0.94" | 940 m || 
|-id=682 bgcolor=#E9E9E9
| 464682 ||  || — || October 13, 2001 || Socorro || LINEAR || — || align=right | 1.6 km || 
|-id=683 bgcolor=#E9E9E9
| 464683 ||  || — || October 22, 2001 || Socorro || LINEAR || EUN || align=right | 1.3 km || 
|-id=684 bgcolor=#fefefe
| 464684 ||  || — || October 23, 2001 || Palomar || NEAT || H || align=right data-sort-value="0.87" | 870 m || 
|-id=685 bgcolor=#d6d6d6
| 464685 ||  || — || October 21, 2001 || Kitt Peak || Spacewatch || — || align=right | 3.6 km || 
|-id=686 bgcolor=#E9E9E9
| 464686 ||  || — || November 10, 2001 || Socorro || LINEAR || — || align=right | 2.5 km || 
|-id=687 bgcolor=#E9E9E9
| 464687 ||  || — || November 12, 2001 || Anderson Mesa || LONEOS || — || align=right | 1.8 km || 
|-id=688 bgcolor=#E9E9E9
| 464688 ||  || — || November 19, 2001 || Socorro || LINEAR || — || align=right | 2.0 km || 
|-id=689 bgcolor=#E9E9E9
| 464689 ||  || — || November 17, 2001 || Socorro || LINEAR || — || align=right | 1.4 km || 
|-id=690 bgcolor=#E9E9E9
| 464690 ||  || — || October 24, 2001 || Socorro || LINEAR || — || align=right | 1.5 km || 
|-id=691 bgcolor=#E9E9E9
| 464691 ||  || — || November 17, 2001 || Socorro || LINEAR || — || align=right | 1.6 km || 
|-id=692 bgcolor=#fefefe
| 464692 ||  || — || December 14, 2001 || Socorro || LINEAR || H || align=right data-sort-value="0.77" | 770 m || 
|-id=693 bgcolor=#E9E9E9
| 464693 ||  || — || October 19, 2001 || Kitt Peak || Spacewatch || — || align=right | 1.5 km || 
|-id=694 bgcolor=#E9E9E9
| 464694 ||  || — || January 9, 2002 || Socorro || LINEAR || — || align=right | 2.0 km || 
|-id=695 bgcolor=#E9E9E9
| 464695 ||  || — || January 19, 2002 || Kitt Peak || Spacewatch || — || align=right | 2.3 km || 
|-id=696 bgcolor=#E9E9E9
| 464696 ||  || — || February 12, 2002 || Kitt Peak || Spacewatch || — || align=right | 1.9 km || 
|-id=697 bgcolor=#fefefe
| 464697 ||  || — || March 10, 2002 || Kitt Peak || Spacewatch || (2076) || align=right data-sort-value="0.61" | 610 m || 
|-id=698 bgcolor=#fefefe
| 464698 ||  || — || April 9, 2002 || Anderson Mesa || LONEOS || H || align=right data-sort-value="0.69" | 690 m || 
|-id=699 bgcolor=#fefefe
| 464699 ||  || — || April 13, 2002 || Palomar || NEAT || — || align=right data-sort-value="0.60" | 600 m || 
|-id=700 bgcolor=#E9E9E9
| 464700 ||  || — || May 15, 2002 || Haleakala || NEAT || — || align=right | 2.5 km || 
|}

464701–464800 

|-bgcolor=#d6d6d6
| 464701 ||  || — || July 5, 2002 || Socorro || LINEAR || — || align=right | 2.5 km || 
|-id=702 bgcolor=#fefefe
| 464702 ||  || — || August 6, 2002 || Palomar || NEAT || — || align=right data-sort-value="0.84" | 840 m || 
|-id=703 bgcolor=#d6d6d6
| 464703 ||  || — || August 2, 2002 || Campo Imperatore || CINEOS || — || align=right | 2.7 km || 
|-id=704 bgcolor=#fefefe
| 464704 ||  || — || August 12, 2002 || Socorro || LINEAR || — || align=right | 1.1 km || 
|-id=705 bgcolor=#fefefe
| 464705 ||  || — || August 14, 2002 || Palomar || R. Matson || — || align=right data-sort-value="0.67" | 670 m || 
|-id=706 bgcolor=#fefefe
| 464706 ||  || — || August 27, 2002 || Palomar || NEAT || — || align=right data-sort-value="0.88" | 880 m || 
|-id=707 bgcolor=#fefefe
| 464707 ||  || — || August 17, 2002 || Palomar || NEAT || NYS || align=right data-sort-value="0.66" | 660 m || 
|-id=708 bgcolor=#fefefe
| 464708 ||  || — || August 17, 2002 || Palomar || NEAT || — || align=right data-sort-value="0.63" | 630 m || 
|-id=709 bgcolor=#d6d6d6
| 464709 ||  || — || August 18, 2002 || Palomar || NEAT || — || align=right | 2.1 km || 
|-id=710 bgcolor=#fefefe
| 464710 ||  || — || August 19, 2002 || Palomar || NEAT || — || align=right data-sort-value="0.87" | 870 m || 
|-id=711 bgcolor=#fefefe
| 464711 ||  || — || August 29, 2002 || Palomar || NEAT || NYS || align=right data-sort-value="0.49" | 490 m || 
|-id=712 bgcolor=#fefefe
| 464712 ||  || — || August 17, 2002 || Palomar || NEAT || — || align=right data-sort-value="0.56" | 560 m || 
|-id=713 bgcolor=#d6d6d6
| 464713 ||  || — || August 19, 2002 || Palomar || NEAT || — || align=right | 2.8 km || 
|-id=714 bgcolor=#fefefe
| 464714 ||  || — || September 4, 2002 || Palomar || NEAT || — || align=right data-sort-value="0.75" | 750 m || 
|-id=715 bgcolor=#fefefe
| 464715 ||  || — || September 4, 2002 || Anderson Mesa || LONEOS || — || align=right data-sort-value="0.89" | 890 m || 
|-id=716 bgcolor=#fefefe
| 464716 ||  || — || September 11, 2002 || Palomar || NEAT || — || align=right data-sort-value="0.99" | 990 m || 
|-id=717 bgcolor=#d6d6d6
| 464717 ||  || — || September 11, 2002 || Palomar || NEAT || — || align=right | 2.9 km || 
|-id=718 bgcolor=#E9E9E9
| 464718 ||  || — || October 21, 1998 || Caussols || ODAS || (5) || align=right | 1.1 km || 
|-id=719 bgcolor=#d6d6d6
| 464719 ||  || — || September 14, 2002 || Palomar || NEAT || — || align=right | 2.8 km || 
|-id=720 bgcolor=#fefefe
| 464720 ||  || — || September 14, 2002 || Palomar || NEAT || NYS || align=right data-sort-value="0.40" | 400 m || 
|-id=721 bgcolor=#fefefe
| 464721 ||  || — || September 27, 2002 || Palomar || NEAT || NYS || align=right data-sort-value="0.73" | 730 m || 
|-id=722 bgcolor=#d6d6d6
| 464722 ||  || — || September 17, 2002 || Palomar || NEAT || — || align=right | 2.7 km || 
|-id=723 bgcolor=#d6d6d6
| 464723 ||  || — || October 2, 2002 || Socorro || LINEAR || — || align=right | 2.9 km || 
|-id=724 bgcolor=#fefefe
| 464724 ||  || — || October 4, 2002 || Socorro || LINEAR || — || align=right data-sort-value="0.69" | 690 m || 
|-id=725 bgcolor=#d6d6d6
| 464725 ||  || — || September 14, 2002 || Anderson Mesa || LONEOS || — || align=right | 3.0 km || 
|-id=726 bgcolor=#fefefe
| 464726 ||  || — || October 8, 2002 || Anderson Mesa || LONEOS || — || align=right data-sort-value="0.96" | 960 m || 
|-id=727 bgcolor=#d6d6d6
| 464727 ||  || — || October 10, 2002 || Socorro || LINEAR || — || align=right | 3.2 km || 
|-id=728 bgcolor=#d6d6d6
| 464728 ||  || — || October 4, 2002 || Apache Point || SDSS || — || align=right | 2.6 km || 
|-id=729 bgcolor=#fefefe
| 464729 ||  || — || October 4, 2002 || Apache Point || SDSS || — || align=right data-sort-value="0.76" | 760 m || 
|-id=730 bgcolor=#d6d6d6
| 464730 ||  || — || October 10, 2002 || Apache Point || SDSS || Tj (2.99) || align=right | 2.8 km || 
|-id=731 bgcolor=#d6d6d6
| 464731 ||  || — || October 29, 2002 || Kitt Peak || Spacewatch || — || align=right | 3.3 km || 
|-id=732 bgcolor=#d6d6d6
| 464732 ||  || — || October 29, 2002 || Apache Point || SDSS || — || align=right | 2.4 km || 
|-id=733 bgcolor=#fefefe
| 464733 ||  || — || December 3, 2002 || Palomar || NEAT || H || align=right data-sort-value="0.70" | 700 m || 
|-id=734 bgcolor=#fefefe
| 464734 ||  || — || December 3, 2002 || Palomar || NEAT || H || align=right data-sort-value="0.91" | 910 m || 
|-id=735 bgcolor=#E9E9E9
| 464735 ||  || — || February 3, 2003 || Palomar || NEAT || — || align=right | 2.0 km || 
|-id=736 bgcolor=#E9E9E9
| 464736 ||  || — || March 11, 2003 || Socorro || LINEAR || — || align=right | 3.0 km || 
|-id=737 bgcolor=#fefefe
| 464737 ||  || — || March 10, 2003 || Anderson Mesa || LONEOS || — || align=right data-sort-value="0.69" | 690 m || 
|-id=738 bgcolor=#fefefe
| 464738 ||  || — || April 26, 2003 || Kitt Peak || Spacewatch || — || align=right data-sort-value="0.62" | 620 m || 
|-id=739 bgcolor=#E9E9E9
| 464739 ||  || — || May 22, 2003 || Kitt Peak || Spacewatch || — || align=right | 1.5 km || 
|-id=740 bgcolor=#E9E9E9
| 464740 ||  || — || July 4, 2003 || Socorro || LINEAR || — || align=right | 2.7 km || 
|-id=741 bgcolor=#E9E9E9
| 464741 ||  || — || July 25, 2003 || Socorro || LINEAR || — || align=right | 2.2 km || 
|-id=742 bgcolor=#FA8072
| 464742 ||  || — || August 1, 2003 || Socorro || LINEAR || — || align=right data-sort-value="0.80" | 800 m || 
|-id=743 bgcolor=#FA8072
| 464743 Stanislavkomárek ||  ||  || August 6, 2003 || Kleť || KLENOT || — || align=right data-sort-value="0.61" | 610 m || 
|-id=744 bgcolor=#fefefe
| 464744 ||  || — || August 20, 2003 || Campo Imperatore || CINEOS || — || align=right data-sort-value="0.60" | 600 m || 
|-id=745 bgcolor=#E9E9E9
| 464745 Péterrózsa ||  ||  || September 5, 2003 || Piszkéstető || K. Sárneczky, B. Sipőcz || — || align=right | 2.3 km || 
|-id=746 bgcolor=#fefefe
| 464746 ||  || — || September 14, 2003 || Palomar || NEAT || — || align=right data-sort-value="0.66" | 660 m || 
|-id=747 bgcolor=#d6d6d6
| 464747 ||  || — || September 16, 2003 || Haleakala || NEAT || — || align=right | 2.8 km || 
|-id=748 bgcolor=#fefefe
| 464748 ||  || — || September 18, 2003 || Socorro || LINEAR || — || align=right data-sort-value="0.78" | 780 m || 
|-id=749 bgcolor=#d6d6d6
| 464749 ||  || — || September 18, 2003 || Palomar || NEAT || 3:2 || align=right | 7.5 km || 
|-id=750 bgcolor=#fefefe
| 464750 ||  || — || September 3, 2003 || Socorro || LINEAR || — || align=right data-sort-value="0.83" | 830 m || 
|-id=751 bgcolor=#d6d6d6
| 464751 ||  || — || September 20, 2003 || Socorro || LINEAR || — || align=right | 3.5 km || 
|-id=752 bgcolor=#fefefe
| 464752 ||  || — || September 20, 2003 || Palomar || NEAT || — || align=right data-sort-value="0.91" | 910 m || 
|-id=753 bgcolor=#fefefe
| 464753 ||  || — || September 21, 2003 || Anderson Mesa || LONEOS || — || align=right | 3.6 km || 
|-id=754 bgcolor=#d6d6d6
| 464754 ||  || — || September 18, 2003 || Kitt Peak || Spacewatch || — || align=right | 2.3 km || 
|-id=755 bgcolor=#FA8072
| 464755 ||  || — || September 28, 2003 || Socorro || LINEAR || — || align=right data-sort-value="0.99" | 990 m || 
|-id=756 bgcolor=#d6d6d6
| 464756 ||  || — || September 20, 2003 || Kitt Peak || Spacewatch || — || align=right | 2.5 km || 
|-id=757 bgcolor=#fefefe
| 464757 ||  || — || September 30, 2003 || Socorro || LINEAR || — || align=right | 1.5 km || 
|-id=758 bgcolor=#fefefe
| 464758 ||  || — || September 16, 2003 || Kitt Peak || Spacewatch || — || align=right data-sort-value="0.64" | 640 m || 
|-id=759 bgcolor=#fefefe
| 464759 ||  || — || September 30, 2003 || Kitt Peak || Spacewatch || MAS || align=right data-sort-value="0.68" | 680 m || 
|-id=760 bgcolor=#fefefe
| 464760 ||  || — || September 26, 2003 || Apache Point || SDSS || — || align=right data-sort-value="0.85" | 850 m || 
|-id=761 bgcolor=#fefefe
| 464761 ||  || — || September 26, 2003 || Apache Point || SDSS || — || align=right data-sort-value="0.98" | 980 m || 
|-id=762 bgcolor=#fefefe
| 464762 ||  || — || September 19, 2003 || Kitt Peak || Spacewatch || — || align=right data-sort-value="0.69" | 690 m || 
|-id=763 bgcolor=#fefefe
| 464763 ||  || — || October 1, 2003 || Anderson Mesa || LONEOS || — || align=right data-sort-value="0.80" | 800 m || 
|-id=764 bgcolor=#FA8072
| 464764 ||  || — || October 20, 2003 || Kitt Peak || Spacewatch || — || align=right data-sort-value="0.87" | 870 m || 
|-id=765 bgcolor=#d6d6d6
| 464765 ||  || — || October 19, 2003 || Kitt Peak || Spacewatch || — || align=right | 3.2 km || 
|-id=766 bgcolor=#E9E9E9
| 464766 ||  || — || August 26, 2003 || Socorro || LINEAR || — || align=right | 2.6 km || 
|-id=767 bgcolor=#d6d6d6
| 464767 ||  || — || October 21, 2003 || Kitt Peak || Spacewatch || — || align=right | 2.6 km || 
|-id=768 bgcolor=#d6d6d6
| 464768 ||  || — || October 19, 2003 || Kitt Peak || Spacewatch || — || align=right | 2.4 km || 
|-id=769 bgcolor=#fefefe
| 464769 ||  || — || September 16, 2003 || Kitt Peak || Spacewatch || (2076) || align=right data-sort-value="0.88" | 880 m || 
|-id=770 bgcolor=#fefefe
| 464770 ||  || — || October 23, 2003 || Kitt Peak || Spacewatch || — || align=right data-sort-value="0.79" | 790 m || 
|-id=771 bgcolor=#fefefe
| 464771 ||  || — || October 21, 2003 || Kitt Peak || Spacewatch || V || align=right data-sort-value="0.57" | 570 m || 
|-id=772 bgcolor=#d6d6d6
| 464772 ||  || — || October 23, 2003 || Anderson Mesa || LONEOS || — || align=right | 2.8 km || 
|-id=773 bgcolor=#fefefe
| 464773 ||  || — || September 28, 2003 || Kitt Peak || Spacewatch || MAS || align=right data-sort-value="0.54" | 540 m || 
|-id=774 bgcolor=#fefefe
| 464774 ||  || — || October 29, 2003 || Socorro || LINEAR || — || align=right data-sort-value="0.67" | 670 m || 
|-id=775 bgcolor=#fefefe
| 464775 ||  || — || October 29, 2003 || Anderson Mesa || LONEOS || — || align=right data-sort-value="0.71" | 710 m || 
|-id=776 bgcolor=#d6d6d6
| 464776 ||  || — || September 28, 2003 || Kitt Peak || Spacewatch || EOS || align=right | 1.5 km || 
|-id=777 bgcolor=#fefefe
| 464777 ||  || — || October 17, 2003 || Apache Point || SDSS || (2076) || align=right data-sort-value="0.71" | 710 m || 
|-id=778 bgcolor=#d6d6d6
| 464778 ||  || — || October 22, 2003 || Apache Point || SDSS || TRE || align=right | 2.0 km || 
|-id=779 bgcolor=#d6d6d6
| 464779 ||  || — || October 20, 2003 || Kitt Peak || Spacewatch || — || align=right | 1.6 km || 
|-id=780 bgcolor=#d6d6d6
| 464780 ||  || — || November 20, 2003 || Kitt Peak || Spacewatch || — || align=right | 2.7 km || 
|-id=781 bgcolor=#d6d6d6
| 464781 ||  || — || November 2, 2003 || Socorro || LINEAR || — || align=right | 3.2 km || 
|-id=782 bgcolor=#d6d6d6
| 464782 ||  || — || November 20, 2003 || Kitt Peak || Spacewatch || — || align=right | 2.8 km || 
|-id=783 bgcolor=#d6d6d6
| 464783 ||  || — || November 21, 2003 || Socorro || LINEAR || — || align=right | 3.0 km || 
|-id=784 bgcolor=#d6d6d6
| 464784 ||  || — || November 24, 2003 || Kitt Peak || Spacewatch || EOS || align=right | 2.2 km || 
|-id=785 bgcolor=#d6d6d6
| 464785 ||  || — || November 28, 2003 || Kitt Peak || Spacewatch || — || align=right | 2.6 km || 
|-id=786 bgcolor=#fefefe
| 464786 ||  || — || November 19, 2003 || Kitt Peak || Spacewatch || — || align=right data-sort-value="0.67" | 670 m || 
|-id=787 bgcolor=#d6d6d6
| 464787 ||  || — || December 1, 2003 || Kitt Peak || Spacewatch || — || align=right | 2.9 km || 
|-id=788 bgcolor=#d6d6d6
| 464788 ||  || — || December 1, 2003 || Kitt Peak || Spacewatch || EOS || align=right | 1.6 km || 
|-id=789 bgcolor=#fefefe
| 464789 ||  || — || January 13, 2004 || Kitt Peak || Spacewatch || — || align=right data-sort-value="0.54" | 540 m || 
|-id=790 bgcolor=#fefefe
| 464790 ||  || — || January 17, 2004 || Kitt Peak || Spacewatch || — || align=right data-sort-value="0.69" | 690 m || 
|-id=791 bgcolor=#d6d6d6
| 464791 ||  || — || December 29, 2003 || Kitt Peak || Spacewatch || — || align=right | 2.4 km || 
|-id=792 bgcolor=#d6d6d6
| 464792 ||  || — || December 21, 2003 || Kitt Peak || Spacewatch || — || align=right | 3.2 km || 
|-id=793 bgcolor=#d6d6d6
| 464793 ||  || — || January 16, 2004 || Mount Graham || W. H. Ryan || — || align=right | 2.3 km || 
|-id=794 bgcolor=#d6d6d6
| 464794 ||  || — || January 22, 2004 || Socorro || LINEAR || Tj (2.99) || align=right | 3.7 km || 
|-id=795 bgcolor=#d6d6d6
| 464795 ||  || — || January 19, 2004 || Kitt Peak || Spacewatch || — || align=right | 2.3 km || 
|-id=796 bgcolor=#d6d6d6
| 464796 ||  || — || March 15, 2004 || Kitt Peak || Spacewatch || — || align=right | 2.2 km || 
|-id=797 bgcolor=#FFC2E0
| 464797 ||  || — || March 18, 2004 || Socorro || LINEAR || APO +1km || align=right data-sort-value="0.73" | 730 m || 
|-id=798 bgcolor=#FFC2E0
| 464798 ||  || — || May 15, 2004 || Catalina || CSS || ATEcritical || align=right | 1.1 km || 
|-id=799 bgcolor=#E9E9E9
| 464799 ||  || — || May 15, 2004 || Socorro || LINEAR || — || align=right | 1.2 km || 
|-id=800 bgcolor=#E9E9E9
| 464800 ||  || — || May 15, 2004 || Socorro || LINEAR || — || align=right data-sort-value="0.68" | 680 m || 
|}

464801–464900 

|-bgcolor=#E9E9E9
| 464801 ||  || — || April 25, 2004 || Kitt Peak || Spacewatch || — || align=right data-sort-value="0.71" | 710 m || 
|-id=802 bgcolor=#E9E9E9
| 464802 ||  || — || July 11, 2004 || Socorro || LINEAR || — || align=right data-sort-value="0.89" | 890 m || 
|-id=803 bgcolor=#E9E9E9
| 464803 ||  || — || August 9, 2004 || Anderson Mesa || LONEOS || — || align=right | 1.4 km || 
|-id=804 bgcolor=#E9E9E9
| 464804 ||  || — || July 11, 2004 || Socorro || LINEAR || — || align=right | 1.7 km || 
|-id=805 bgcolor=#E9E9E9
| 464805 ||  || — || August 22, 2004 || Reedy Creek || J. Broughton || — || align=right | 2.8 km || 
|-id=806 bgcolor=#d6d6d6
| 464806 ||  || — || September 8, 2004 || Socorro || LINEAR || — || align=right | 2.2 km || 
|-id=807 bgcolor=#E9E9E9
| 464807 ||  || — || September 8, 2004 || Socorro || LINEAR || MRX || align=right | 1.1 km || 
|-id=808 bgcolor=#fefefe
| 464808 ||  || — || September 8, 2004 || Socorro || LINEAR || — || align=right data-sort-value="0.67" | 670 m || 
|-id=809 bgcolor=#E9E9E9
| 464809 ||  || — || August 12, 2004 || Socorro || LINEAR || — || align=right | 1.6 km || 
|-id=810 bgcolor=#E9E9E9
| 464810 ||  || — || September 7, 2004 || Kitt Peak || Spacewatch || — || align=right | 2.2 km || 
|-id=811 bgcolor=#E9E9E9
| 464811 ||  || — || July 14, 2004 || Socorro || LINEAR || — || align=right | 1.7 km || 
|-id=812 bgcolor=#E9E9E9
| 464812 ||  || — || September 10, 2004 || Socorro || LINEAR || JUN || align=right | 1.0 km || 
|-id=813 bgcolor=#E9E9E9
| 464813 ||  || — || September 11, 2004 || Socorro || LINEAR || — || align=right | 2.9 km || 
|-id=814 bgcolor=#fefefe
| 464814 ||  || — || September 14, 2004 || Socorro || LINEAR || H || align=right data-sort-value="0.75" | 750 m || 
|-id=815 bgcolor=#FA8072
| 464815 ||  || — || August 27, 2004 || Catalina || CSS || — || align=right data-sort-value="0.80" | 800 m || 
|-id=816 bgcolor=#E9E9E9
| 464816 ||  || — || September 17, 2004 || Kitt Peak || Spacewatch || — || align=right | 1.5 km || 
|-id=817 bgcolor=#FA8072
| 464817 ||  || — || September 9, 2004 || Socorro || LINEAR || — || align=right data-sort-value="0.71" | 710 m || 
|-id=818 bgcolor=#E9E9E9
| 464818 ||  || — || October 4, 2004 || Kitt Peak || Spacewatch || (1547) || align=right | 1.4 km || 
|-id=819 bgcolor=#E9E9E9
| 464819 ||  || — || October 4, 2004 || Kitt Peak || Spacewatch || — || align=right | 3.0 km || 
|-id=820 bgcolor=#E9E9E9
| 464820 ||  || — || October 5, 2004 || Kitt Peak || Spacewatch || — || align=right | 1.3 km || 
|-id=821 bgcolor=#E9E9E9
| 464821 ||  || — || October 7, 2004 || Socorro || LINEAR || — || align=right | 1.8 km || 
|-id=822 bgcolor=#E9E9E9
| 464822 ||  || — || October 7, 2004 || Kitt Peak || Spacewatch || — || align=right | 1.9 km || 
|-id=823 bgcolor=#d6d6d6
| 464823 ||  || — || October 7, 2004 || Kitt Peak || Spacewatch || — || align=right | 2.5 km || 
|-id=824 bgcolor=#d6d6d6
| 464824 ||  || — || October 7, 2004 || Kitt Peak || Spacewatch || 615 || align=right | 1.5 km || 
|-id=825 bgcolor=#fefefe
| 464825 ||  || — || October 11, 2004 || Kitt Peak || Spacewatch || H || align=right data-sort-value="0.57" | 570 m || 
|-id=826 bgcolor=#E9E9E9
| 464826 ||  || — || October 7, 2004 || Kitt Peak || Spacewatch || — || align=right | 2.4 km || 
|-id=827 bgcolor=#d6d6d6
| 464827 ||  || — || November 4, 2004 || Kitt Peak || Spacewatch ||  || align=right | 1.8 km || 
|-id=828 bgcolor=#E9E9E9
| 464828 ||  || — || November 5, 2004 || Socorro || LINEAR || — || align=right | 2.8 km || 
|-id=829 bgcolor=#fefefe
| 464829 ||  || — || December 11, 2004 || Campo Imperatore || CINEOS || — || align=right data-sort-value="0.84" | 840 m || 
|-id=830 bgcolor=#FA8072
| 464830 ||  || — || December 2, 2004 || Palomar || NEAT || H || align=right data-sort-value="0.72" | 720 m || 
|-id=831 bgcolor=#FA8072
| 464831 ||  || — || December 20, 2004 || Mount Lemmon || Mount Lemmon Survey || — || align=right data-sort-value="0.68" | 680 m || 
|-id=832 bgcolor=#d6d6d6
| 464832 ||  || — || November 21, 2004 || Campo Imperatore || CINEOS || — || align=right | 3.4 km || 
|-id=833 bgcolor=#d6d6d6
| 464833 ||  || — || February 1, 2005 || Kitt Peak || Spacewatch || — || align=right | 2.2 km || 
|-id=834 bgcolor=#fefefe
| 464834 ||  || — || February 1, 2005 || Kitt Peak || Spacewatch || — || align=right data-sort-value="0.77" | 770 m || 
|-id=835 bgcolor=#d6d6d6
| 464835 ||  || — || February 2, 2005 || Kitt Peak || Spacewatch || — || align=right | 2.8 km || 
|-id=836 bgcolor=#fefefe
| 464836 ||  || — || February 2, 2005 || Kitt Peak || Spacewatch || — || align=right data-sort-value="0.49" | 490 m || 
|-id=837 bgcolor=#d6d6d6
| 464837 ||  || — || February 2, 2005 || Kitt Peak || Spacewatch || — || align=right | 3.2 km || 
|-id=838 bgcolor=#d6d6d6
| 464838 ||  || — || February 2, 2005 || Kitt Peak || Spacewatch || — || align=right | 3.6 km || 
|-id=839 bgcolor=#d6d6d6
| 464839 ||  || — || February 2, 2005 || Kitt Peak || Spacewatch || — || align=right | 3.1 km || 
|-id=840 bgcolor=#d6d6d6
| 464840 ||  || — || March 3, 2005 || Kitt Peak || Spacewatch || — || align=right | 2.8 km || 
|-id=841 bgcolor=#fefefe
| 464841 ||  || — || March 4, 2005 || Mount Lemmon || Mount Lemmon Survey || — || align=right data-sort-value="0.70" | 700 m || 
|-id=842 bgcolor=#fefefe
| 464842 ||  || — || March 7, 2005 || Socorro || LINEAR || H || align=right data-sort-value="0.63" | 630 m || 
|-id=843 bgcolor=#fefefe
| 464843 ||  || — || March 4, 2005 || Kitt Peak || Spacewatch || — || align=right data-sort-value="0.73" | 730 m || 
|-id=844 bgcolor=#fefefe
| 464844 ||  || — || March 4, 2005 || Mount Lemmon || Mount Lemmon Survey || NYS || align=right data-sort-value="0.48" | 480 m || 
|-id=845 bgcolor=#d6d6d6
| 464845 ||  || — || March 9, 2005 || Mount Lemmon || Mount Lemmon Survey || — || align=right | 2.3 km || 
|-id=846 bgcolor=#fefefe
| 464846 ||  || — || March 3, 2005 || Catalina || CSS || — || align=right data-sort-value="0.80" | 800 m || 
|-id=847 bgcolor=#fefefe
| 464847 ||  || — || March 10, 2005 || Mount Lemmon || Mount Lemmon Survey || — || align=right data-sort-value="0.65" | 650 m || 
|-id=848 bgcolor=#fefefe
| 464848 ||  || — || March 11, 2005 || Mount Lemmon || Mount Lemmon Survey || NYS || align=right data-sort-value="0.55" | 550 m || 
|-id=849 bgcolor=#d6d6d6
| 464849 ||  || — || March 13, 2005 || Kitt Peak || Spacewatch || — || align=right | 2.1 km || 
|-id=850 bgcolor=#fefefe
| 464850 ||  || — || March 8, 2005 || Catalina || CSS || H || align=right data-sort-value="0.65" | 650 m || 
|-id=851 bgcolor=#d6d6d6
| 464851 ||  || — || March 15, 2005 || Mount Lemmon || Mount Lemmon Survey || THB || align=right | 3.7 km || 
|-id=852 bgcolor=#fefefe
| 464852 ||  || — || March 17, 2005 || Catalina || CSS || — || align=right | 1.0 km || 
|-id=853 bgcolor=#d6d6d6
| 464853 ||  || — || March 11, 2005 || Kitt Peak || Spacewatch || — || align=right | 2.8 km || 
|-id=854 bgcolor=#d6d6d6
| 464854 ||  || — || April 4, 2005 || Kitt Peak || Spacewatch || — || align=right | 2.7 km || 
|-id=855 bgcolor=#fefefe
| 464855 ||  || — || April 4, 2005 || Mount Lemmon || Mount Lemmon Survey || MAS || align=right data-sort-value="0.69" | 690 m || 
|-id=856 bgcolor=#fefefe
| 464856 ||  || — || April 5, 2005 || Mount Lemmon || Mount Lemmon Survey || NYS || align=right data-sort-value="0.51" | 510 m || 
|-id=857 bgcolor=#fefefe
| 464857 ||  || — || March 17, 2005 || Kitt Peak || Spacewatch || — || align=right data-sort-value="0.73" | 730 m || 
|-id=858 bgcolor=#fefefe
| 464858 ||  || — || April 5, 2005 || Mount Lemmon || Mount Lemmon Survey || — || align=right data-sort-value="0.68" | 680 m || 
|-id=859 bgcolor=#d6d6d6
| 464859 ||  || — || April 2, 2005 || Catalina || CSS || — || align=right | 2.5 km || 
|-id=860 bgcolor=#d6d6d6
| 464860 ||  || — || April 5, 2005 || Catalina || CSS || Tj (2.99) || align=right | 3.8 km || 
|-id=861 bgcolor=#fefefe
| 464861 ||  || — || April 7, 2005 || Kitt Peak || Spacewatch || critical || align=right data-sort-value="0.68" | 680 m || 
|-id=862 bgcolor=#fefefe
| 464862 ||  || — || April 10, 2005 || Mount Lemmon || Mount Lemmon Survey || MAS || align=right data-sort-value="0.75" | 750 m || 
|-id=863 bgcolor=#fefefe
| 464863 ||  || — || April 10, 2005 || Mount Lemmon || Mount Lemmon Survey || — || align=right | 1.0 km || 
|-id=864 bgcolor=#fefefe
| 464864 ||  || — || April 10, 2005 || Kitt Peak || Spacewatch || — || align=right data-sort-value="0.81" | 810 m || 
|-id=865 bgcolor=#d6d6d6
| 464865 ||  || — || April 14, 2005 || Kitt Peak || Spacewatch || — || align=right | 4.0 km || 
|-id=866 bgcolor=#d6d6d6
| 464866 ||  || — || April 6, 2005 || Catalina || CSS || — || align=right | 3.8 km || 
|-id=867 bgcolor=#fefefe
| 464867 ||  || — || April 6, 2005 || Catalina || CSS || — || align=right data-sort-value="0.99" | 990 m || 
|-id=868 bgcolor=#d6d6d6
| 464868 ||  || — || April 30, 2005 || Kitt Peak || Spacewatch || — || align=right | 1.6 km || 
|-id=869 bgcolor=#d6d6d6
| 464869 ||  || — || May 4, 2005 || Kitt Peak || DLS || Tj (2.99) || align=right | 3.4 km || 
|-id=870 bgcolor=#fefefe
| 464870 ||  || — || May 3, 2005 || Kitt Peak || Spacewatch || — || align=right data-sort-value="0.68" | 680 m || 
|-id=871 bgcolor=#d6d6d6
| 464871 ||  || — || May 3, 2005 || Kitt Peak || Spacewatch || critical || align=right | 2.7 km || 
|-id=872 bgcolor=#fefefe
| 464872 ||  || — || May 4, 2005 || Socorro || LINEAR || — || align=right data-sort-value="0.74" | 740 m || 
|-id=873 bgcolor=#d6d6d6
| 464873 ||  || — || May 8, 2005 || Kitt Peak || Spacewatch || — || align=right | 3.5 km || 
|-id=874 bgcolor=#fefefe
| 464874 ||  || — || May 8, 2005 || Kitt Peak || Spacewatch || V || align=right data-sort-value="0.61" | 610 m || 
|-id=875 bgcolor=#d6d6d6
| 464875 ||  || — || May 11, 2005 || Kitt Peak || Spacewatch || — || align=right | 3.2 km || 
|-id=876 bgcolor=#d6d6d6
| 464876 ||  || — || April 30, 2005 || Kitt Peak || Spacewatch || — || align=right | 2.1 km || 
|-id=877 bgcolor=#d6d6d6
| 464877 ||  || — || April 30, 2005 || Kitt Peak || Spacewatch || — || align=right | 2.8 km || 
|-id=878 bgcolor=#fefefe
| 464878 ||  || — || May 14, 2005 || Mount Lemmon || Mount Lemmon Survey || NYS || align=right data-sort-value="0.70" | 700 m || 
|-id=879 bgcolor=#d6d6d6
| 464879 ||  || — || April 9, 2005 || Mount Lemmon || Mount Lemmon Survey || EOS || align=right | 2.0 km || 
|-id=880 bgcolor=#d6d6d6
| 464880 ||  || — || May 10, 2005 || Kitt Peak || Spacewatch || — || align=right | 3.2 km || 
|-id=881 bgcolor=#fefefe
| 464881 ||  || — || May 5, 2005 || Kitt Peak || DLS || H || align=right data-sort-value="0.94" | 940 m || 
|-id=882 bgcolor=#fefefe
| 464882 ||  || — || March 10, 2005 || Mount Lemmon || Mount Lemmon Survey || (5026) || align=right data-sort-value="0.75" | 750 m || 
|-id=883 bgcolor=#d6d6d6
| 464883 ||  || — || May 19, 2005 || Mount Lemmon || Mount Lemmon Survey || — || align=right | 2.9 km || 
|-id=884 bgcolor=#fefefe
| 464884 ||  || — || June 1, 2005 || Kitt Peak || Spacewatch || (5026) || align=right data-sort-value="0.85" | 850 m || 
|-id=885 bgcolor=#FFC2E0
| 464885 ||  || — || June 4, 2005 || Socorro || LINEAR || AMO || align=right data-sort-value="0.38" | 380 m || 
|-id=886 bgcolor=#d6d6d6
| 464886 ||  || — || May 8, 2005 || Kitt Peak || Spacewatch || — || align=right | 3.3 km || 
|-id=887 bgcolor=#d6d6d6
| 464887 ||  || — || May 4, 2005 || Mount Lemmon || Mount Lemmon Survey || — || align=right | 4.1 km || 
|-id=888 bgcolor=#fefefe
| 464888 ||  || — || May 29, 2005 || Siding Spring || SSS || — || align=right data-sort-value="0.83" | 830 m || 
|-id=889 bgcolor=#d6d6d6
| 464889 ||  || — || June 29, 2005 || Kitt Peak || Spacewatch || — || align=right | 3.7 km || 
|-id=890 bgcolor=#fefefe
| 464890 ||  || — || July 4, 2005 || Kitt Peak || Spacewatch || — || align=right data-sort-value="0.78" | 780 m || 
|-id=891 bgcolor=#d6d6d6
| 464891 ||  || — || August 6, 2005 || Socorro || LINEAR || Tj (2.96) || align=right | 5.1 km || 
|-id=892 bgcolor=#E9E9E9
| 464892 ||  || — || August 9, 2005 || Socorro || LINEAR || — || align=right | 2.2 km || 
|-id=893 bgcolor=#d6d6d6
| 464893 ||  || — || August 28, 2005 || Siding Spring || SSS || Tj (2.93) || align=right | 3.7 km || 
|-id=894 bgcolor=#d6d6d6
| 464894 ||  || — || August 30, 2005 || Kitt Peak || Spacewatch || 7:4 || align=right | 4.2 km || 
|-id=895 bgcolor=#E9E9E9
| 464895 ||  || — || August 28, 2005 || Kitt Peak || Spacewatch || — || align=right | 1.5 km || 
|-id=896 bgcolor=#E9E9E9
| 464896 ||  || — || September 12, 2005 || Socorro || LINEAR || — || align=right | 1.8 km || 
|-id=897 bgcolor=#E9E9E9
| 464897 ||  || — || September 23, 2005 || Catalina || CSS || — || align=right | 1.3 km || 
|-id=898 bgcolor=#E9E9E9
| 464898 ||  || — || September 9, 2005 || Socorro || LINEAR || — || align=right | 1.8 km || 
|-id=899 bgcolor=#E9E9E9
| 464899 ||  || — || September 23, 2005 || Catalina || CSS || — || align=right | 1.4 km || 
|-id=900 bgcolor=#E9E9E9
| 464900 ||  || — || September 24, 2005 || Kitt Peak || Spacewatch || — || align=right | 1.3 km || 
|}

464901–465000 

|-bgcolor=#E9E9E9
| 464901 ||  || — || September 26, 2005 || Kitt Peak || Spacewatch || (5) || align=right data-sort-value="0.65" | 650 m || 
|-id=902 bgcolor=#E9E9E9
| 464902 ||  || — || September 24, 2005 || Kitt Peak || Spacewatch || — || align=right data-sort-value="0.96" | 960 m || 
|-id=903 bgcolor=#E9E9E9
| 464903 ||  || — || September 29, 2005 || Kitt Peak || Spacewatch || ADE || align=right | 2.0 km || 
|-id=904 bgcolor=#E9E9E9
| 464904 ||  || — || September 26, 2005 || Kitt Peak || Spacewatch || — || align=right | 1.1 km || 
|-id=905 bgcolor=#E9E9E9
| 464905 ||  || — || September 29, 2005 || Mount Lemmon || Mount Lemmon Survey || — || align=right data-sort-value="0.57" | 570 m || 
|-id=906 bgcolor=#E9E9E9
| 464906 ||  || — || September 29, 2005 || Mount Lemmon || Mount Lemmon Survey || — || align=right | 1.2 km || 
|-id=907 bgcolor=#E9E9E9
| 464907 ||  || — || September 29, 2005 || Mount Lemmon || Mount Lemmon Survey || (5) || align=right data-sort-value="0.71" | 710 m || 
|-id=908 bgcolor=#E9E9E9
| 464908 ||  || — || September 29, 2005 || Anderson Mesa || LONEOS || — || align=right | 1.8 km || 
|-id=909 bgcolor=#E9E9E9
| 464909 ||  || — || September 23, 2005 || Kitt Peak || Spacewatch || EUN || align=right | 1.3 km || 
|-id=910 bgcolor=#E9E9E9
| 464910 ||  || — || October 3, 2005 || Palomar || NEAT || — || align=right | 1.7 km || 
|-id=911 bgcolor=#E9E9E9
| 464911 ||  || — || October 2, 2005 || Mount Lemmon || Mount Lemmon Survey || — || align=right | 1.00 km || 
|-id=912 bgcolor=#d6d6d6
| 464912 ||  || — || October 1, 2005 || Mount Lemmon || Mount Lemmon Survey || 7:4 || align=right | 3.2 km || 
|-id=913 bgcolor=#E9E9E9
| 464913 ||  || — || October 3, 2005 || Kitt Peak || Spacewatch || — || align=right | 1.6 km || 
|-id=914 bgcolor=#E9E9E9
| 464914 ||  || — || October 3, 2005 || Kitt Peak || Spacewatch || — || align=right data-sort-value="0.79" | 790 m || 
|-id=915 bgcolor=#E9E9E9
| 464915 ||  || — || October 3, 2005 || Socorro || LINEAR || EUN || align=right | 1.3 km || 
|-id=916 bgcolor=#E9E9E9
| 464916 ||  || — || October 9, 2005 || Kitt Peak || Spacewatch || — || align=right | 1.4 km || 
|-id=917 bgcolor=#E9E9E9
| 464917 ||  || — || September 29, 2005 || Kitt Peak || Spacewatch || — || align=right | 1.1 km || 
|-id=918 bgcolor=#E9E9E9
| 464918 ||  || — || September 24, 2005 || Kitt Peak || Spacewatch || — || align=right data-sort-value="0.98" | 980 m || 
|-id=919 bgcolor=#E9E9E9
| 464919 ||  || — || September 29, 2005 || Kitt Peak || Spacewatch || — || align=right data-sort-value="0.92" | 920 m || 
|-id=920 bgcolor=#E9E9E9
| 464920 ||  || — || October 10, 2005 || Kitt Peak || Spacewatch || — || align=right | 1.4 km || 
|-id=921 bgcolor=#E9E9E9
| 464921 ||  || — || October 24, 2005 || Kitt Peak || Spacewatch || — || align=right | 1.8 km || 
|-id=922 bgcolor=#E9E9E9
| 464922 ||  || — || October 22, 2005 || Kitt Peak || Spacewatch || — || align=right | 2.0 km || 
|-id=923 bgcolor=#E9E9E9
| 464923 ||  || — || September 25, 2005 || Kitt Peak || Spacewatch || — || align=right | 1.4 km || 
|-id=924 bgcolor=#E9E9E9
| 464924 ||  || — || October 22, 2005 || Kitt Peak || Spacewatch || MRX || align=right | 1.0 km || 
|-id=925 bgcolor=#E9E9E9
| 464925 ||  || — || October 22, 2005 || Kitt Peak || Spacewatch || — || align=right | 1.0 km || 
|-id=926 bgcolor=#E9E9E9
| 464926 ||  || — || October 24, 2005 || Kitt Peak || Spacewatch || — || align=right | 1.5 km || 
|-id=927 bgcolor=#E9E9E9
| 464927 ||  || — || October 5, 2005 || Catalina || CSS || — || align=right | 1.9 km || 
|-id=928 bgcolor=#E9E9E9
| 464928 ||  || — || October 24, 2005 || Kitt Peak || Spacewatch || — || align=right | 1.1 km || 
|-id=929 bgcolor=#E9E9E9
| 464929 ||  || — || October 24, 2005 || Kitt Peak || Spacewatch || — || align=right | 2.0 km || 
|-id=930 bgcolor=#E9E9E9
| 464930 ||  || — || October 24, 2005 || Kitt Peak || Spacewatch || — || align=right | 1.2 km || 
|-id=931 bgcolor=#E9E9E9
| 464931 ||  || — || October 25, 2005 || Kitt Peak || Spacewatch || — || align=right | 1.2 km || 
|-id=932 bgcolor=#E9E9E9
| 464932 ||  || — || October 27, 2005 || Kitt Peak || Spacewatch || — || align=right | 1.5 km || 
|-id=933 bgcolor=#E9E9E9
| 464933 ||  || — || October 22, 2005 || Palomar || NEAT || — || align=right | 1.6 km || 
|-id=934 bgcolor=#E9E9E9
| 464934 ||  || — || October 25, 2005 || Kitt Peak || Spacewatch || MAR || align=right | 1.1 km || 
|-id=935 bgcolor=#E9E9E9
| 464935 ||  || — || October 25, 2005 || Kitt Peak || Spacewatch || — || align=right | 1.8 km || 
|-id=936 bgcolor=#E9E9E9
| 464936 ||  || — || September 30, 2005 || Mount Lemmon || Mount Lemmon Survey || — || align=right | 1.4 km || 
|-id=937 bgcolor=#E9E9E9
| 464937 ||  || — || October 26, 2005 || Kitt Peak || Spacewatch || — || align=right | 1.4 km || 
|-id=938 bgcolor=#E9E9E9
| 464938 ||  || — || October 26, 2005 || Kitt Peak || Spacewatch || — || align=right | 1.1 km || 
|-id=939 bgcolor=#E9E9E9
| 464939 ||  || — || September 24, 2005 || Kitt Peak || Spacewatch || — || align=right | 1.3 km || 
|-id=940 bgcolor=#E9E9E9
| 464940 ||  || — || October 28, 2005 || Mount Lemmon || Mount Lemmon Survey || — || align=right | 1.0 km || 
|-id=941 bgcolor=#FA8072
| 464941 ||  || — || October 1, 2005 || Socorro || LINEAR || — || align=right | 1.6 km || 
|-id=942 bgcolor=#E9E9E9
| 464942 ||  || — || October 27, 2005 || Kitt Peak || Spacewatch || — || align=right | 1.7 km || 
|-id=943 bgcolor=#E9E9E9
| 464943 ||  || — || October 1, 2005 || Catalina || CSS || — || align=right | 1.3 km || 
|-id=944 bgcolor=#E9E9E9
| 464944 ||  || — || October 23, 2005 || Palomar || NEAT || — || align=right | 1.7 km || 
|-id=945 bgcolor=#E9E9E9
| 464945 ||  || — || October 22, 2005 || Catalina || CSS || — || align=right | 1.3 km || 
|-id=946 bgcolor=#E9E9E9
| 464946 ||  || — || November 3, 2005 || Socorro || LINEAR || (5) || align=right data-sort-value="0.89" | 890 m || 
|-id=947 bgcolor=#E9E9E9
| 464947 ||  || — || October 24, 2005 || Kitt Peak || Spacewatch || — || align=right | 1.5 km || 
|-id=948 bgcolor=#E9E9E9
| 464948 ||  || — || September 30, 2005 || Mount Lemmon || Mount Lemmon Survey || — || align=right | 1.6 km || 
|-id=949 bgcolor=#E9E9E9
| 464949 ||  || — || November 2, 2005 || Socorro || LINEAR || EUN || align=right | 1.2 km || 
|-id=950 bgcolor=#E9E9E9
| 464950 ||  || — || November 1, 2005 || Mount Lemmon || Mount Lemmon Survey || — || align=right | 1.6 km || 
|-id=951 bgcolor=#E9E9E9
| 464951 ||  || — || November 1, 2005 || Mount Lemmon || Mount Lemmon Survey || — || align=right | 1.8 km || 
|-id=952 bgcolor=#E9E9E9
| 464952 ||  || — || November 3, 2005 || Catalina || CSS || EUN || align=right | 1.2 km || 
|-id=953 bgcolor=#E9E9E9
| 464953 ||  || — || September 30, 2005 || Anderson Mesa || LONEOS || — || align=right | 1.4 km || 
|-id=954 bgcolor=#E9E9E9
| 464954 ||  || — || October 25, 2005 || Mount Lemmon || Mount Lemmon Survey || — || align=right | 1.7 km || 
|-id=955 bgcolor=#E9E9E9
| 464955 ||  || — || November 1, 2005 || Kitt Peak || Spacewatch || AEO || align=right data-sort-value="0.81" | 810 m || 
|-id=956 bgcolor=#E9E9E9
| 464956 ||  || — || September 30, 2005 || Mount Lemmon || Mount Lemmon Survey || — || align=right | 1.5 km || 
|-id=957 bgcolor=#d6d6d6
| 464957 ||  || — || October 1, 2005 || Mount Lemmon || Mount Lemmon Survey || 3:2 || align=right | 3.9 km || 
|-id=958 bgcolor=#E9E9E9
| 464958 ||  || — || November 22, 2005 || Kitt Peak || Spacewatch || — || align=right | 2.4 km || 
|-id=959 bgcolor=#E9E9E9
| 464959 ||  || — || November 25, 2005 || Kitt Peak || Spacewatch || — || align=right | 1.9 km || 
|-id=960 bgcolor=#E9E9E9
| 464960 ||  || — || November 28, 2005 || Mount Lemmon || Mount Lemmon Survey || — || align=right | 1.4 km || 
|-id=961 bgcolor=#E9E9E9
| 464961 ||  || — || November 6, 2005 || Socorro || LINEAR || — || align=right | 2.5 km || 
|-id=962 bgcolor=#E9E9E9
| 464962 ||  || — || November 26, 2005 || Mount Lemmon || Mount Lemmon Survey || — || align=right | 2.2 km || 
|-id=963 bgcolor=#E9E9E9
| 464963 ||  || — || November 25, 2005 || Kitt Peak || Spacewatch || NEM || align=right | 1.7 km || 
|-id=964 bgcolor=#E9E9E9
| 464964 ||  || — || November 25, 2005 || Mount Lemmon || Mount Lemmon Survey || — || align=right | 1.1 km || 
|-id=965 bgcolor=#E9E9E9
| 464965 ||  || — || November 10, 2005 || Catalina || CSS || — || align=right | 1.7 km || 
|-id=966 bgcolor=#E9E9E9
| 464966 ||  || — || October 31, 2005 || Mount Lemmon || Mount Lemmon Survey || — || align=right | 1.2 km || 
|-id=967 bgcolor=#E9E9E9
| 464967 ||  || — || November 6, 2005 || Kitt Peak || Spacewatch || — || align=right | 2.3 km || 
|-id=968 bgcolor=#E9E9E9
| 464968 ||  || — || December 2, 2005 || Kitt Peak || Spacewatch || — || align=right | 2.0 km || 
|-id=969 bgcolor=#E9E9E9
| 464969 ||  || — || December 5, 2005 || Socorro || LINEAR || — || align=right | 2.0 km || 
|-id=970 bgcolor=#E9E9E9
| 464970 ||  || — || November 25, 2005 || Kitt Peak || Spacewatch || — || align=right | 1.8 km || 
|-id=971 bgcolor=#E9E9E9
| 464971 ||  || — || November 26, 2005 || Kitt Peak || Spacewatch || — || align=right | 2.3 km || 
|-id=972 bgcolor=#E9E9E9
| 464972 ||  || — || October 22, 2005 || Kitt Peak || Spacewatch || — || align=right | 1.0 km || 
|-id=973 bgcolor=#E9E9E9
| 464973 ||  || — || December 22, 2005 || Kitt Peak || Spacewatch || — || align=right | 1.8 km || 
|-id=974 bgcolor=#E9E9E9
| 464974 ||  || — || December 24, 2005 || Kitt Peak || Spacewatch || — || align=right | 2.8 km || 
|-id=975 bgcolor=#E9E9E9
| 464975 ||  || — || December 22, 2005 || Kitt Peak || Spacewatch || HOF || align=right | 2.5 km || 
|-id=976 bgcolor=#E9E9E9
| 464976 ||  || — || December 6, 2005 || Kitt Peak || Spacewatch || — || align=right | 2.0 km || 
|-id=977 bgcolor=#E9E9E9
| 464977 ||  || — || December 31, 2005 || Kitt Peak || Spacewatch || — || align=right | 1.9 km || 
|-id=978 bgcolor=#E9E9E9
| 464978 ||  || — || December 25, 2005 || Mount Lemmon || Mount Lemmon Survey || — || align=right | 2.4 km || 
|-id=979 bgcolor=#E9E9E9
| 464979 ||  || — || December 27, 2005 || Kitt Peak || Spacewatch || — || align=right | 1.7 km || 
|-id=980 bgcolor=#E9E9E9
| 464980 ||  || — || November 25, 2005 || Mount Lemmon || Mount Lemmon Survey || — || align=right | 1.5 km || 
|-id=981 bgcolor=#E9E9E9
| 464981 ||  || — || January 2, 2006 || Mount Lemmon || Mount Lemmon Survey || GEF || align=right | 1.2 km || 
|-id=982 bgcolor=#E9E9E9
| 464982 ||  || — || December 29, 2005 || Kitt Peak || Spacewatch || EUN || align=right | 1.2 km || 
|-id=983 bgcolor=#E9E9E9
| 464983 ||  || — || December 28, 2005 || Mount Lemmon || Mount Lemmon Survey || — || align=right | 1.6 km || 
|-id=984 bgcolor=#FA8072
| 464984 ||  || — || January 3, 2006 || Socorro || LINEAR || — || align=right data-sort-value="0.54" | 540 m || 
|-id=985 bgcolor=#E9E9E9
| 464985 ||  || — || January 23, 2006 || Mount Lemmon || Mount Lemmon Survey || — || align=right | 2.5 km || 
|-id=986 bgcolor=#E9E9E9
| 464986 ||  || — || January 20, 2006 || Kitt Peak || Spacewatch || HOF || align=right | 2.5 km || 
|-id=987 bgcolor=#E9E9E9
| 464987 ||  || — || January 23, 2006 || Kitt Peak || Spacewatch || — || align=right | 2.2 km || 
|-id=988 bgcolor=#E9E9E9
| 464988 ||  || — || January 8, 2006 || Mount Lemmon || Mount Lemmon Survey || DOR || align=right | 1.8 km || 
|-id=989 bgcolor=#E9E9E9
| 464989 ||  || — || January 23, 2006 || Mount Lemmon || Mount Lemmon Survey || — || align=right | 2.0 km || 
|-id=990 bgcolor=#E9E9E9
| 464990 ||  || — || January 25, 2006 || Kitt Peak || Spacewatch || — || align=right | 1.9 km || 
|-id=991 bgcolor=#fefefe
| 464991 ||  || — || January 26, 2006 || Kitt Peak || Spacewatch || — || align=right data-sort-value="0.62" | 620 m || 
|-id=992 bgcolor=#E9E9E9
| 464992 ||  || — || January 28, 2006 || Mount Lemmon || Mount Lemmon Survey || AGN || align=right | 1.0 km || 
|-id=993 bgcolor=#E9E9E9
| 464993 ||  || — || January 23, 2006 || Socorro || LINEAR || — || align=right | 2.3 km || 
|-id=994 bgcolor=#d6d6d6
| 464994 ||  || — || January 27, 2006 || Mount Lemmon || Mount Lemmon Survey || KOR || align=right | 1.8 km || 
|-id=995 bgcolor=#fefefe
| 464995 ||  || — || February 20, 2006 || Kitt Peak || Spacewatch || — || align=right data-sort-value="0.55" | 550 m || 
|-id=996 bgcolor=#d6d6d6
| 464996 ||  || — || February 7, 2006 || Mount Lemmon || Mount Lemmon Survey || — || align=right | 3.4 km || 
|-id=997 bgcolor=#fefefe
| 464997 ||  || — || February 24, 2006 || Kitt Peak || Spacewatch || — || align=right data-sort-value="0.44" | 440 m || 
|-id=998 bgcolor=#fefefe
| 464998 ||  || — || February 24, 2006 || Kitt Peak || Spacewatch || — || align=right data-sort-value="0.75" | 750 m || 
|-id=999 bgcolor=#fefefe
| 464999 ||  || — || February 24, 2006 || Kitt Peak || Spacewatch || H || align=right data-sort-value="0.49" | 490 m || 
|-id=000 bgcolor=#fefefe
| 465000 ||  || — || February 25, 2006 || Kitt Peak || Spacewatch || — || align=right data-sort-value="0.55" | 550 m || 
|}

References

External links 
 Discovery Circumstances: Numbered Minor Planets (460001)–(465000) (IAU Minor Planet Center)

0464